= Absolute genetic divergence =

Measure to genetic distance between populations

Absolute genetic divergence, often denoted as $d_{XY}$, is a measure used in population genetics to quantify the average number of nucleotide differences per site between two DNA sequences drawn from different populations. Unlike relative measures of divergence such as the Fixation index ($F_{ST}$), absolute genetic divergence is independent of the genetic diversity within the populations being compared. It is frequently used in evolutionary biology to detect gene flow, estimate species divergence times, and investigate "genomic islands" of speciation.

== Definition and Calculation ==
Absolute genetic divergence was formally defined by Masatoshi Nei in 1987. It represents the average number of pairwise nucleotide differences between all possible pairs of sequences where one is taken from population X and the other from population Y.

Mathematically, it is calculated as:

$$d_{XY} = \sum_{i,j} x_i y_j d_{ij}$$

Where:

- $x_i$ is the frequency of the i-th haplotype in population X.
- $y_j$ is the frequency of the j-th haplotype in population Y.
- $d_{ij}$ is the number of nucleotide differences between haplotype i and haplotype j.

Because it measures the average pairwise differences regardless of population subdivision, $d_{XY}$ is mathematically equivalent to the total nucleotide diversity ($\pi_{Total}$) if the two populations were pooled together.

== Comparison with Relative Divergence ($F_{ST}$) ==
A major application of $d_{XY}$ is to distinguish between evolutionary processes that affect genetic variation within populations versus those that affect divergence between populations.

- Relative Divergence ($F_{ST}$): Measures population differentiation relative to the total genetic variance. It can be inflated solely by a reduction in within-population diversity ($\pi$), even if the populations have not actually diverged significantly in terms of sequence mutations.
- Absolute Divergence ($d_{XY}$): Measures the accumulation of sequence differences. It is generally not affected by current within-population diversity or selective sweeps that reduce local variation.

In the study of "genomic islands of speciation" (regions of the genome with high differentiation), $d_{XY}$ is often used as a control statistic. If a genomic region has high $F_{ST}$ but normal or low $d_{XY}$, the differentiation is likely driven by reduced diversity (e.g., linked selection or background selection) rather than accelerated divergence or a barrier to gene flow.

== Relation to Ancestral Diversity ==
Absolute divergence is influenced by the diversity of the ancestral population. The value of $d_{XY}$ reflects both the mutations accumulated after the populations split and the polymorphism that was present in the common ancestor.

$$E(d_{XY}) = 2\mu t + \theta_{Anc}$$

Where:

- $\mu$ is the mutation rate.
- $t$ is the time since divergence.
- $\theta_{Anc}$ is the ancestral nucleotide diversity.

Because of this relationship, $d_{XY}$ requires a significant amount of time to accumulate after speciation, leading to a "time lag" in its utility for detecting very recent divergence compared to other metrics.

== See also ==
- Fixation index ($F_{ST}$)
- Nucleotide diversity
- Genetic distance
- Coalescent theory
