= Wahlund effect =

Effect in population genetics

A De Finetti diagram illustrating the Wahlund effect. The curved line are the Hardy–Weinberg equilibrium genotype frequencies; points 1 and 2 denote two populations in equilibrium. The genotype frequencies of the combined population are a weighted mean of the subpopulation frequencies, corresponding to a point somewhere on the solid line connecting 1 and 2. This point always has a lower heterozygosity (y value) than the corresponding (in allele frequency p) Hardy-Weinberg equilibrium.

In population genetics, the Wahlund effect is a reduction of heterozygosity (that is when an organism has two different alleles at a locus) in a population caused by subpopulation structure. Namely, if two or more subpopulations are in a Hardy–Weinberg equilibrium but have different allele frequencies, the overall heterozygosity is reduced compared to if the whole population was in equilibrium. The underlying causes of this population subdivision could be geographic barriers to gene flow followed by genetic drift in the subpopulations.

The Wahlund effect was first described by the Swedish geneticist Sten Wahlund in 1928.

== Simplest example ==
Suppose there is a population $P$, with allele frequencies of A and a given by $p$ and $q$ respectively ($p + q = 1$). Suppose this population is split into two equally-sized subpopulations, $P_1$ and $P_2$, and that all the A alleles are in subpopulation $P_1$ and all the a alleles are in subpopulation $P_2$ (this could occur due to drift). Then, there are no heterozygotes, even though the subpopulations are in a Hardy–Weinberg equilibrium.

== Case of two alleles and two subpopulations ==
To make a slight generalization of the above example, let $p_1$ and $p_2$ represent the allele frequencies of A in $P_1$ and $P_2$, respectively (and $q_1$ and $q_2$ likewise represent a).

Let the allele frequency in each population be different, i.e. $p_1 \ne p_2$.

Suppose each population is in an internal Hardy–Weinberg equilibrium, so that the genotype frequencies AA, Aa and aa are p^{2}, 2pq, and q^{2} respectively for each population.

Then the heterozygosity ($H$) in the overall population is given by the mean of the two:

$$\begin{align}
H & = {2p_1q_1 + 2p_2q_2 \over 2} \\[5pt]
& = {p_1q_1 + p_2q_2} \\[5pt]
& = {p_1(1-p_1) + p_2(1-p_2)}
\end{align}$$

which is always smaller than $2p(1-p)$ (${}=2pq$) unless $p_1=p_2$

== Generalization ==
The Wahlund effect may be generalized to different subpopulations of different sizes. The heterozygosity of the total population is then given by the mean of the heterozygosities of the subpopulations, weighted by the subpopulation size.

== F-statistics ==
The reduction in heterozygosity can be measured using F-statistics.

== See also ==
- Hardy–Weinberg principle
- Cryptic relatedness
- F-statistics
- Coefficient of relationship
- Coefficient of inbreeding
