= Fixation index =

Measure of population differentiation

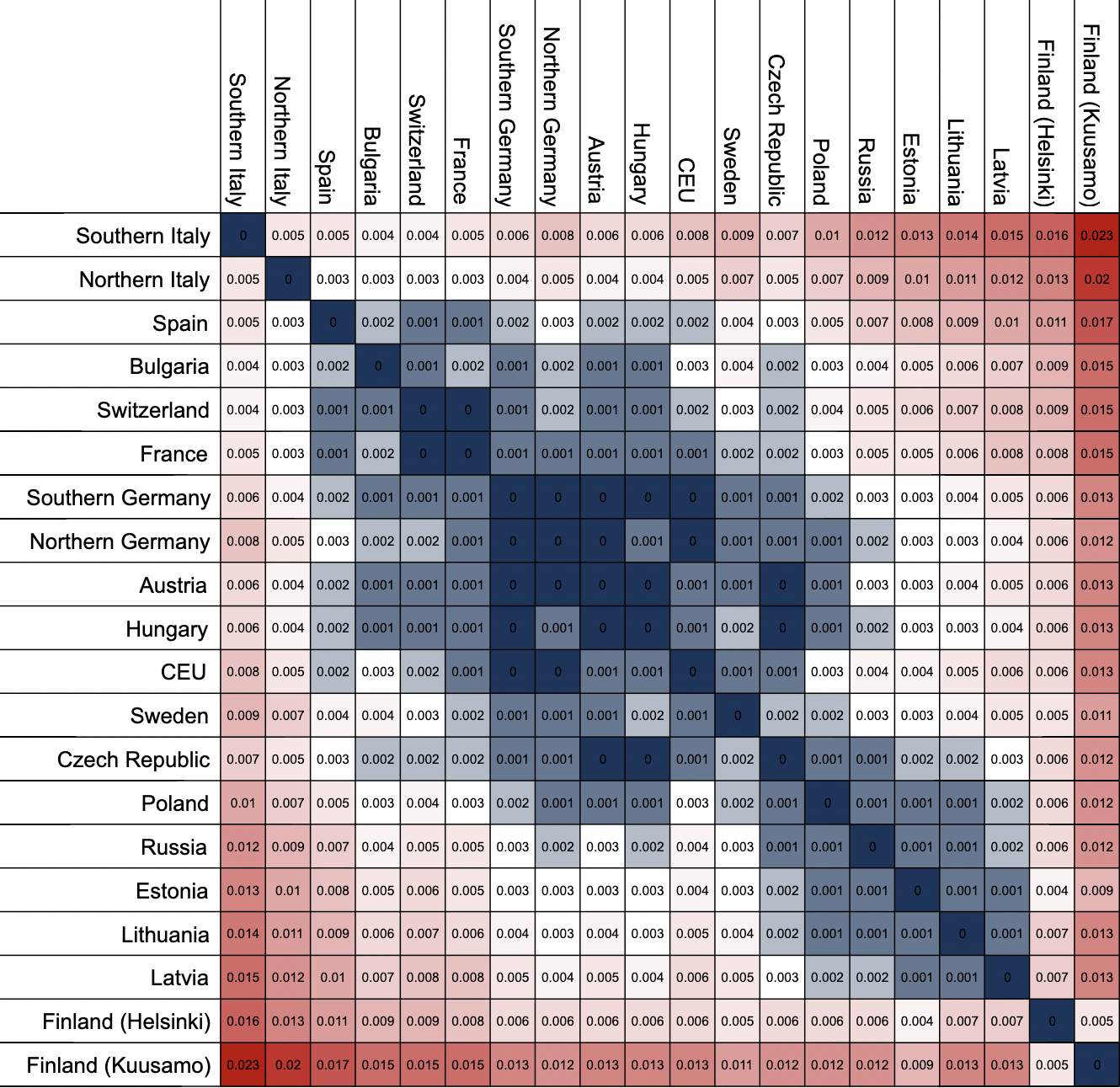
Fst values between European populations

The fixation index (F_{ST}) is a measure of population differentiation due to genetic structure. It is frequently estimated from genetic polymorphism data, such as single-nucleotide polymorphisms (SNP) or microsatellites. Developed as a special case of Wright's F-statistics, it is one of the most commonly used statistics in population genetics. Its values range from 0 to 1, with 0 being no differentiation and 1 being complete differentiation.

== Interpretation ==
This comparison of genetic variability within and between populations is frequently used in applied population genetics. The values range from 0 to 1. A zero value implies complete panmixia; that is, that the two populations are interbreeding freely. A value of one implies that all genetic variation is explained by the population structure, and that the two populations do not share any genetic diversity.

For idealized models such as Wright's finite island model, F_{ST} can be used to estimate migration rates. Under that model, the migration rate is

$$M = \frac{m}{\mu} \approx\frac{1}{4}\left (\frac{1}{F_{ST}} -1  \right )$$,

where m is the migration rate per generation, and $\mu$ is the mutation rate per generation.

The interpretation of F_{ST} can be difficult when the data analyzed are highly polymorphic. In this case, the probability of identity by descent is very low and F_{ST} can have an arbitrarily low upper bound, which might lead to misinterpretation of the data. Also, strictly speaking F_{ST} is not a distance in the mathematical sense, as it does not satisfy the triangle inequality.

== Definition ==
Two of the most commonly used definitions for F_{ST} at a given locus are based on 1) the variance of allele frequencies among populations, and on 2) the probability of identity by descent.

If $\bar{p}$ is the average frequency of an allele in the total population, $\sigma^2_S$ is the variance in the frequency of the allele among different subpopulations, weighted by the sizes of the subpopulations, and $\sigma^2_T$ is the variance of the allelic state in the total population, F_{ST} is defined as

$$F_{ST} = \frac{\sigma^2_S}{\sigma^2_T} = \frac{\sigma^2_S}{\bar{p}(1-\bar{p})}$$

Wright's definition illustrates that F_{ST} measures the amount of genetic variance that can be explained by population structure. This can also be thought of as the fraction of total diversity that is not a consequence of the average diversity within subpopulations, where diversity is measured by the probability that two randomly selected alleles are different, namely $2p(1-p)$. If the allele frequency in the $i$th population is $p_i$ and the relative size of the $i$th population is $c_i$, then

$$F_{ST} = \frac{\bar{p}(1-\bar{p})-\sum c_i p_i(1-p_i)}{\bar{p}(1-\bar{p})} = \frac{\bar{p}(1-\bar{p})- \overline{p(1-p)}}{\bar{p}(1-\bar{p})}$$

Alternatively,

$$F_{ST} = \frac{f_0-\bar{f}}{1-\bar{f}}$$

where $f_0$ is the probability of identity by descent of two individuals given that the two individuals are in the same subpopulation, and $\bar{f}$ is the probability that two individuals from the total population are identical by descent. Using this definition, F_{ST} can be interpreted as measuring how much closer two individuals from the same subpopulation are, compared to the total population. If the mutation rate is small, this interpretation can be made more explicit by linking the probability of identity by descent to coalescent times: Let T_{0} and T denote the average time to coalescence for individuals from the same subpopulation and the total population, respectively. Then,

$$F_{ST} \approx 1-\frac{T_0}{T}$$

This formulation has the advantage that the expected time to coalescence can easily be estimated from genetic data, which led to the development of various estimators for F_{ST}.

== Estimation ==
In practice, none of the quantities used for the definitions can be easily measured. As a consequence, various estimators have been proposed. A particularly simple estimator applicable to DNA sequence data is:

$$F_{ST} = \frac{ \pi_\text{Between} - \pi_\text{Within} } { \pi_\text{Between} }$$

where $\pi_\text{Between}$ and $\pi_\text{Within}$ represent the average number of pairwise differences between two individuals sampled from different sub-populations ($\pi_\text{Between}$) or from the same sub-population ($\pi_\text{Within}$). The average pairwise difference within a population can be calculated as the sum of the pairwise differences divided by the number of pairs. However, this estimator is biased when sample sizes are small or if they vary between populations. Therefore, more elaborate methods are used to compute F_{ST} in practice. Two of the most widely used procedures are the estimator by Weir & Cockerham (1984), or performing an Analysis of molecular variance. A list of implementations is available at the end of this article.

== F_{ST} in humans ==
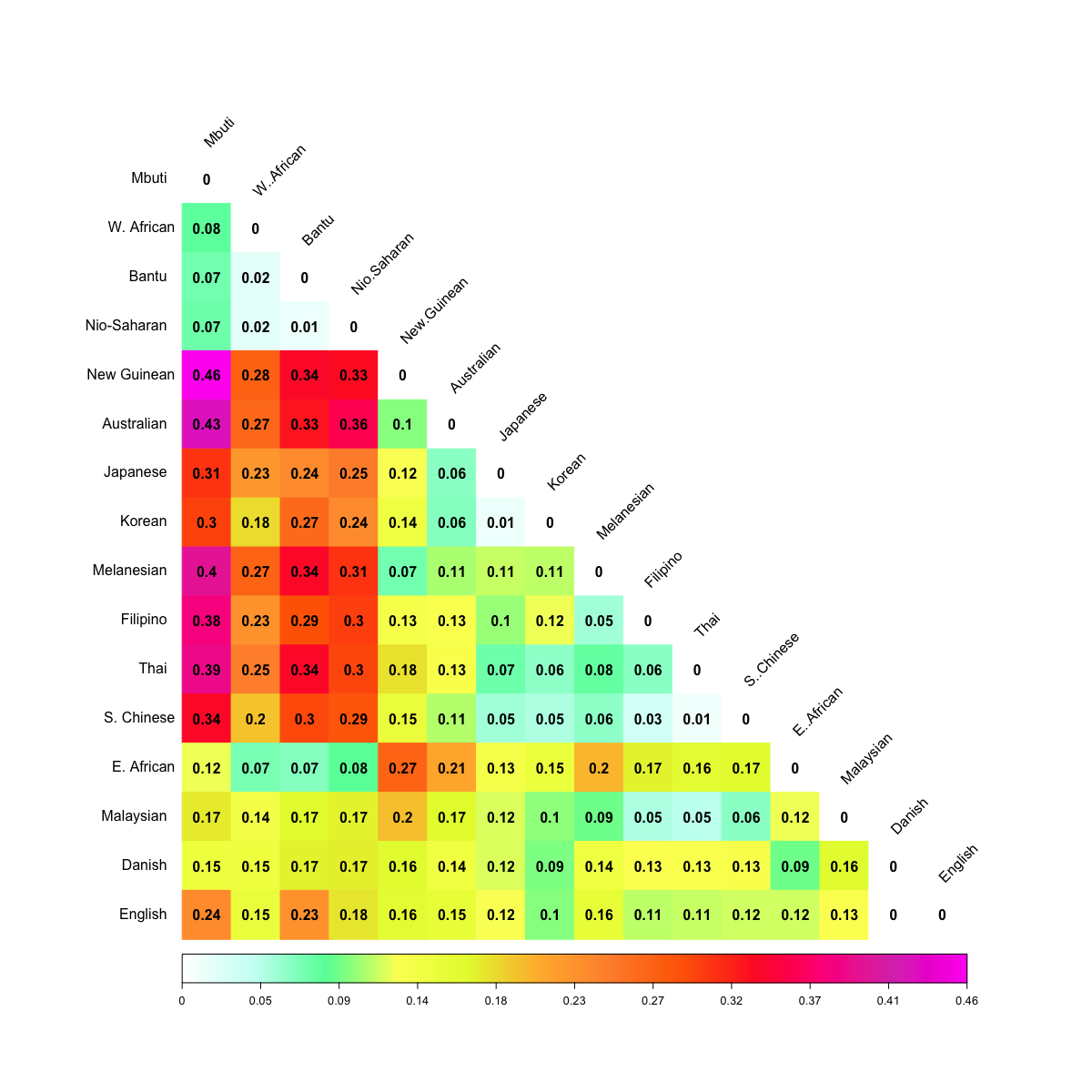
FST values in selected populations

F_{ST} values depend strongly on the choice of populations. Closely related ethnic groups, such as the Danes vs. the Dutch, or the Portuguese vs. the Spaniards show values significantly below 1%, indistinguishable from panmixia. Within Europe, the most divergent ethnic groups have been found to have values of the order of 7% (Sámi vs. Sardinians).

Larger values are found if highly divergent homogenous groups are compared: the highest such value found was at close to 46%, between Mbuti and Papuans.

== Genetic distances in human populations ==
=== Autosomal genetic distances based on classical markers ===
In their study The History and Geography of Human Genes (1994), Cavalli-Sforza, Menozzi and Piazza provide some of the most detailed and comprehensive estimates of genetic distances between human populations, within and across continents. Their initial database contains 76,676 gene frequencies (using 120 blood polymorphisms), corresponding to 6,633 samples in different locations. By culling and pooling such samples, they restrict their analysis to 491 populations.

The 42 world populations used by the authors and their reported FSTs.

They focus on aboriginal populations that were at their present location at the end of the 15th century when the great European migrations began. When studying genetic difference at the world level, the number is reduced to 42 representative populations, aggregating subpopulations characterized by a high level of genetic similarity. For these 42 populations, Cavalli-Sforza and coauthors report bilateral distances computed from 120 alleles. Among this set of 42 world populations, the greatest genetic distance observed is between Mbuti Pygmies and Papua New Guineans, where the Fst distance is 0.4573, while the smallest genetic distance (0.0021) is between the Danish and the English.

When considering more disaggregated data for 26 European populations, the smallest genetic distance (0.0009) is between the Dutch and the Danes, and the largest (0.0667) is between the Lapps and the Sardinians. The mean genetic distance among the 861 available pairings of the 42 selected populations was found to be 0.1338..

The following table shows Fst calculated by Cavalli-Sforza (1994) for some populations:

	Bantu	Nio-Saharan	W. African	Mbuti	Japanese	Korean	Thai	Filipino	S. Chinese	Danish	English	Melanesian	New Guinean	Australian
Bantu	0.00													
Nio-Saharan	0.01	0.00												
W. African	0.02	0.02	0.00											
Mbuti	0.07	0.08	0.08	0.00										
Japanese	0.24	0.25	0.23	0.31	0.00									
Korean	0.27	0.24	0.18	0.30	0.01	0.00								
Thai	0.34	0.30	0.25	0.39	0.07	0.06	0.00							
Filipino	0.29	0.30	0.23	0.38	0.10	0.12	0.06	0.00						
S. Chinese	0.30	0.29	0.20	0.34	0.05	0.05	0.01	0.03	0.00					
Danish	0.17	0.17	0.15	0.15	0.12	0.09	0.13	0.13	0.13	0.00				
English	0.23	0.18	0.15	0.24	0.12	0.10	0.11	0.11	0.12	0.00	0.00			
Melanesian	0.34	0.31	0.27	0.40	0.11	0.11	0.08	0.05	0.06	0.14	0.16	0.00		
New Guinean	0.34	0.33	0.28	0.46	0.12	0.14	0.18	0.13	0.15	0.16	0.16	0.07	0.00	
Australian	0.33	0.36	0.27	0.43	0.06	0.07	0.13	0.13	0.11	0.14	0.15	0.11	0.10	0.00

=== Autosomal genetic distances based on SNPs ===
A 2012 study based on International HapMap Project data estimated F_{ST} between the three major "continental" populations of Europeans (combined from Utah residents of Northern and Western European ancestry from the CEPH collection and Italians from Tuscany), East Asians (combining Han Chinese from Beijing, Chinese from metropolitan Denver and Japanese from Tokyo, Japan) and Sub-Saharan Africans (combining Luhya of Webuye, Kenya, Maasai of Kinyawa, Kenya and Yoruba of Ibadan, Nigeria). It reported a value close to 12% between continental populations, and values close to panmixia (smaller than 1%) within continental populations.

Intercontinental autosomal genetic distances based on SNPs
	Europe (CEU)	Sub-Saharan Africa (Yoruba)	East-Asia (Japanese)
Sub-Saharan Africa (Yoruba)	0.153		
East-Asia (Japanese)	0.111	0.190	
East-Asia (Chinese)	0.110	0.192	0.007

Intra-European/mediterranean autosomal genetic distances based on SNPs
	Italians	Palestinians	Swedish	Finns	Spanish	Germans	Russians	French	Greeks
Palestinians	0.0064								
Swedish	0.0064-0.0090	0.0191							
Finns	0.0130-0.0230		0.0050-0.0110						
Spanish	0.0010-0.0050	0.0101	0.0040-0055	0.0110-0.0170					
Germans	0.0029-0.0080	0.0136	0.0007-0.0010	0.0060-0.0130	0.0015-0.0030				
Russians	0.0088-0.0120	0.0202	0.0030-0.0036	0.0060-0.0120	0.0070-0.0079	0.0030-0.0037			
French	0.0030-0.0050		0.0020	0.0080-0.0150	0.0010	0.0010	0.0050		
Greeks	0.0000	0.0057	0.0084		0.0035	0.0039	0.0108		

=== Autosomal genetic distances based on whole exome sequencing (WES) ===
Pairwise Fst values among several populations based on whole exome sequencing (WES) in 2016:

== Programs for calculating F_{ST} ==
- Arlequin
- Fstat
- SMOGD
- diveRsity (R package)
- hierfstat (R package)
- FinePop (R package)
- Microsatellite Analyzer (MSA)
- VCFtools
- DnaSP
- Popoolation2

== Modules for calculating F_{ST} ==
- BioPerl
- BioPython

== See also ==
- Genetic distance
- F-statistics
- QST_(genetics)
- Coefficient of inbreeding
- Coefficient of relationship
- Hardy-Weinberg principle
- Wahlund effect
