= Wilhelm Weinberg =

German physician (1862–1937)

- Born: 25 December 1862; Stuttgart, Kingdom of Württemberg
- Died: 27 November 1937 (aged 74); Tübingen, Nazi Germany
- Occupation: Obstetrician-gynecologist
- Known for: Hardy–Weinberg principle ascertainment bias

Wilhelm Weinberg (25 December 1862 – 27 November 1937) was a German obstetrician-gynecologist, practicing in Stuttgart, who in a 1908 paper, published in German in Jahresheft des Vereins für vaterländische Naturkunde in Württemberg (The Annals of the Society of National Natural History in Württemberg), expressed the concept that would later come to be known as the Hardy–Weinberg principle.

Weinberg is also credited as the first to explain the effect of ascertainment bias on observations in genetics.

== Hardy–Weinberg principle ==
Weinberg developed the principle of genetic equilibrium independently of British mathematician G.H. Hardy. He delivered an exposition of his ideas in a lecture on 13 January 1908, before the Verein für vaterländische Naturkunde in Württemberg (Society for the Natural History of the Fatherland in Württemberg), about three months before the Hardy's notes from April 1908 of that year and five months before Hardy's paper was published in English in June 1908. His lecture was printed in the society's yearbook in September 1908.

Weinberg's contributions were unrecognized in the English speaking world for more than 35 years. In 1943, Curt Stern, a German scientist who immigrated to the United States before World War II, pointed out in a brief paper in Science that Weinberg's exposition was more comprehensive than Hardy's. Before 1943, the concepts in genetic equilibrium that are known today as the Hardy–Weinberg principle had been known as "Hardy's law" or "Hardy's formula" in English-language texts.

In 1999, James F. Crow wrote: “Why was Weinberg’s paper, published the same year as Hardy’s, neglected for 35 years?" The reason probably is that he wrote in German. At the time, genetics was largely dominated by English-speakers and work in other languages was often ignored.”

== Ascertainment bias and analysis of phenotypic variance ==
Weinberg pioneered in studies of twins, developing techniques for analysis of phenotypic variation that partitioned this variance into genetic and environmental components. In the process, he recognized that ascertainment bias was affecting many of his calculations, and he produced methods to correct for it.

Weinberg observed that proportions of homozygotes in familial studies of classic autosomal recessive genetic diseases generally exceed the expected Mendelian ratio of 1:3, and he explained how this is the result of ascertainment bias. In his work with albino children, he recognized that in some families where both parents carry a recessive mutation, no disease occurs by chance. He reasoned that many carrier couples were not being counted, and he demonstrated methods for correcting results to produce the expected Mendelian ratios.

He discovered the answer to several seeming paradoxes caused by ascertainment bias. For example, he explained that the reason that parents as a whole are more fertile than their children is because children must necessarily come from fertile parents.

By the same token, he recognized that ascertainment was responsible for a phenomenon known as anticipation, the tendency for a genetic disease to manifest earlier in life and with increased severity in later generations. Weinberg recognized that this was because those later generations were the offspring of that selected group of earlier carriers that had successfully reproduced. Subsequent researchers have reasoned that such carriers who reproduce might be expected to carry favorable compensatory mutations that allowed them to reproduce successfully in spite of their disease. In a class of autosomal and X-linked dominant diseases known as trinucleotide repeat disorders (for example, Huntington's disease), a molecular mechanism for anticipation has also been demonstrated. It is caused by the instability of repeating nucleotide sequences that tend to undergo expansion, causing disease at an earlier and earlier age as trinucleotide repeats accumulate.

== Biography ==
Weinberg was born in Stuttgart to Julius Weinberg, a German Jewish merchant, and Maria Magdalena Humbert, of Protestant faith.

He studied medicine at Tübingen, Berlin and Munich, receiving an M.D. in 1886. In 1889, he returned to Stuttgart, where he remained running a large practice as a gynecologist and obstetrician until he retired to Tübingen a few years before his death in 1937. Much of his academic life he spent studying genetics especially focusing on applying the laws of inheritance to populations.

Additional contributions by Weinberg to statistical genetics included the first estimate of the rate of twinning – Realizing that identical twins would have to be same-sex, while dizygotic twins could be either same or opposite sex, Weinberg derived the formula for estimating the frequency of monozygotic and dizygotic twins from the ratio of same sex and opposite twins to the total of maternities. Weinberg also estimated that the heritability of twinning itself was close to zero.
