= Genetic equilibrium =

Genetic equilibrium is the condition of an allele or genotype in a gene pool (such as a population) where the frequency does not change from generation to generation. Genetic equilibrium describes a theoretical state that is the basis for determining whether and in what ways populations may deviate from it. Hardy–Weinberg equilibrium is one theoretical framework for studying genetic equilibrium. It is commonly studied using models that take as their assumptions those of Hardy-Weinberg, meaning:

- No gene mutations occurring at that locus or the loci associated with the trait
- A large population size
- Limited-to-no immigration, emigration, or migration (genetic flow)
- No natural selection on that locus or trait
- Random mating (panmixis)

It can describe other types of equilibrium as well, especially in modeling contexts. In particular, many models use a variation of the Hardy–Weinberg principle as their basis. Instead of all of the Hardy–Weinberg characters being present, these instead assume a balance between the diversifying effects of genetic drift and the homogenizing effects of migration between populations. A population not at equilibrium suggests that one of the assumptions of the model in question has been violated.

== Theoretical models of genetic equilibrium ==
The Hardy–Weinberg principle provides the mathematical framework for genetic equilibrium. In practice, departures from Hardy-Weinberg expectations are routinely tested in genotype data because they can indicate inbreeding, population stratification, or genotyping problems, and exact tests are often preferred when chi-square approximations perform poorly. Genetic equilibrium itself, whether Hardy-Weinberg or otherwise, provides the groundwork for a number of applications, in including population genetics, conservation and evolutionary biology. With the rapid increase in whole genome sequences available as well as the proliferation of anonymous markers, models have been used to extend the initial theory to all manner of biological contexts. Using data from genetic markers such as ISSRs and RAPDs as well as the predictive potential of statistics, studies have developed models to infer what processes drove the lack of equilibrium. This includes local adaptation, range contraction and expansion and lack of gene flow due to geographic or behavioral barriers, although equilibrium modeling has been applied to a wide range of topics and questions.

Equilibrium modeling have led to developments in the field. Because allelic dominance can disrupt predictions of equilibrium, some models have moved away from using genetic equilibrium as an assumption. Instead of the traditional F-statistics, they make use of Bayesian estimates. Holsinger et al. developed an analog to FST, called theta. Studies have found Bayesian estimates to be better predictors of the patterns observed. However, genetic equilibrium-based modeling remains a tool in population and conservation genetics-it can provide invaluable information about previous historical processes.

== Biological study systems ==
Genetic equilibrium has been studied in a number of taxa. Some marine species in particular have been used as study systems. The life history of marine organisms like sea urchins appear to fulfill the requirements of genetic equilibrium modeling better than terrestrial species. They exist in large, panmictic populations that don’t appear to be strongly affected by geographic barriers. In spite of this, some studies have found considerable differentiation across the range of a species. Instead, when looking for genetic equilibrium, studies found large, widespread species complexes. This indicates that genetic equilibrium may be rare or difficult to identify in the wild, due to considerable local demographic changes on shorter time scales.

In fact, although a large population size is a required condition for genetic equilibrium according to Hardy–Weinberg, some have argued that a large population size can actually slow the approach to genetic equilibrium. This can have implications for conservation, where genetic equilibrium can be used as a marker of a healthy and sustainable population.
