= Sten Wahlund =

Swedish human geneticist and politician

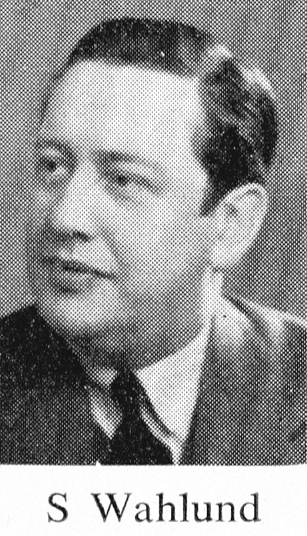
Sten Wahlund

Sten Gösta William Wahlund (1901 — 1976) was a Swedish statistician, race biologist and politician. He is best known for first identifying the Wahlund effect, that subpopulations with different allele frequencies cause reduced heterozygosity than what is expected from Hardy–Weinberg equilibrium.

He graduated from Uppsala University in 1924 and received a PhD in 1933, while working at the State Institute for Racial Biology. He later became important in the Bondeförbundet and was a member of the Swedish parliament.
