= F-statistic =

F-statistic may refer to:

- a test statistic used for the F-test
- a concept in biogenetics, see F-statistics
