= QST (genetics) =

In quantitative genetics, Q_{ST} is a statistic intended to measure the degree of genetic differentiation among populations with regard to a quantitative trait. It was developed by Ken Spitze in 1993. Its name reflects that Q_{ST} was intended to be analogous to the fixation index for a single genetic locus (F_{ST}). Q_{ST} is often compared with F_{ST} of neutral loci to test if variation in a quantitative trait is a result of divergent selection or genetic drift, an analysis known as Q_{ST}–F_{ST} comparisons.

== Calculation of Q_{ST} ==
=== Equations ===
Q_{ST} represents the proportion of variance among subpopulations, and its calculation is synonymous to F_{ST} developed by Sewall Wright. However, instead of using genetic differentiation, Q_{ST} is calculated by finding the variance of a quantitative trait within and among subpopulations, and for the total population. Variance of a quantitative trait among populations (σ^{2}_{GB}) is described as:

$\sigma_{GB}^2 = (1-Q_{ST})\sigma_T^2$

And the variance of a quantitative trait within populations (σ^{2}_{GW}) is described as:

$\sigma _{GW}^2 = 2Q_{ST}\sigma_T^2$

Where σ^{2}_{T} is the total genetic variance in all populations. Therefore, Q_{ST} can be calculated with the following equation:

$Q_{ST} = \frac{\sigma_{GB}^2}{\sigma_{GB}^2 + 2\sigma_{GW}^2}$

=== Assumptions ===
Calculation of Q_{ST} is subject to several assumptions: populations must be in Hardy–Weinberg equilibrium, observed variation is assumed to be due to additive genetic effects only, selection and linkage disequilibrium are not present, and the subpopulations exist within an island model.

== Q_{ST}–F_{ST} comparisons ==
Q_{ST}–F_{ST} analyses often involve culturing organisms in consistent environmental conditions, known as common garden experiments, and comparing the phenotypic variance to genetic variance. If Q_{ST} is found to exceed F_{ST}, this is interpreted as evidence of divergent selection, because it indicates more differentiation in the trait than could be produced solely by genetic drift. If Q_{ST} is less than F_{ST}, balancing selection is expected to be present. If the values of Q_{ST} and F_{ST}are equivalent, the observed trait differentiation could be due to genetic drift.

Suitable comparison of Q_{ST} and F_{ST} is subject to multiple ecological and evolutionary assumptions, and since the development of Q_{ST}, multiple studies have examined the limitations and constrictions of Q_{ST}–F_{ST} analyses. Leinonen et al. notes F_{ST} must be calculated with neutral loci, however over filtering of non-neutral loci can artificially reduce F_{ST}values. Cubry et al. found Q_{ST} is reduced in the presence of dominance, resulting in conservative estimates of divergent selection when Q_{ST} is high, and inconclusive results of balancing selection when Q_{ST} is low. Additionally, population structure can significantly impact Q_{ST}–F_{ST} ratios. Stepping stone models, which can generate more evolutionary noise than island models, are more likely to experience type 1 errors. If a subset of populations act as sources, such as during invasion, weighting the genetic contributions of each population can increase detection of adaptation. In order to improve precision of Q_{ST} analyses, more populations (>20) should be included in analyses.

== Q_{ST} applications in literature ==
Multiple studies have incorporated Q_{ST} to separate effects of natural selection and genetic drift, and Q_{ST} is often observed to exceed F_{ST}, indicating local adaptation. In an ecological restoration study, Bower and Aitken used Q_{ST} to evaluate suitable populations for seed transfer of whitebark pine. They found high Q_{ST} values in many populations, suggesting local adaptation for cold-adapted characteristics. During an assessment of the invasive species, Brachypodium sylvaticum, Marchini et al. found divergence between native and invasive populations during initial establishment in the invaded range, but minimal divergence during range expansion. In an examination of the common snapdragon (Antirrhinum majus) along an elevation gradient, Q_{ST}–F_{ST} analyses revealed different adaptation trends between two subspecies (A. m. pseudomajus and A. m. striatum). While both subspecies occur at all elevations, A. m. striatum had high Q_{ST} values for traits associated with altitude adaptation: plant height, number of branches, and internode length. A. m. pseudomajus had lower Q_{ST} than F_{ST} values for germination time.

== See also ==
- F-statistics
- Quantitative genetics
- Conservation genetics
- Divergent selection
- Genetic diversity
