= Cryptic relatedness =

Presence of undetected relatedness between subjects in genetic association studies

In population genetics, cryptic relatedness occurs when individuals in a genetic association study are more closely related to another population than assumed by the investigators. This can act as a confounding factor in both case-control and genome-wide association studies, as well as in studies of genetic diversity. Along with population stratification, it is one of the most prominent confounding factors that can lead to inflated false positive rates in gene-association studies. It is often corrected for by including a polygenic component in the statistical model being used to detect genetic associations. Other approaches that have been developed to attempt to control for cryptic relatedness are the genomic control method and the use of extended likelihood ratio tests.
