= Sewall Wright =

American geneticist (1889–1988)

Sewall Wright ForMemRS HonFRSE
- Wright in 1954
- Born: December 21, 1889; Melrose, Massachusetts, U.S.
- Died: March 3, 1988 (aged 98); Madison, Wisconsin, U.S.
- Education: Lombard College (BSc); University of Illinois Urbana-Champaign (MSc); Harvard University (PhD)
- Known for: Coefficient of determination Population genetics Causal graph F-statistics; Fixation index Fitness landscape Genetic rescue Genetic drift Inbreeding coefficient Path analysis Shifting balance theory Threshold model
- Awards: Daniel Giraud Elliot Medal (1945); Weldon Memorial Prize (1947); National Medal of Science (1966); Darwin Medal (1980); Thomas Hunt Morgan Medal (1982); Balzan Prize (1984)
- Scientific career
- Fields: Genetics
- Workplaces: University of Chicago (1926–1954); University of Wisconsin (1955–1960)
- Doctoral advisor: William Ernest Castle
- Other academic advisors: Wilhelmine Key

Sewall Green Wright ForMemRS HonFRSE (December 21, 1889 – March 3, 1988) was an American geneticist known for his influential work on evolutionary theory and also for his work on path analysis. He was a founder of population genetics alongside Ronald Fisher and J. B. S. Haldane, which was a major step in the development of the modern synthesis combining genetics with evolution. He discovered the inbreeding coefficient and methods of computing it in pedigree animals. He extended this work to populations, computing the amount of inbreeding between members of populations as a result of random genetic drift, and along with Fisher he pioneered methods for computing the distribution of gene frequencies among populations as a result of the interaction of natural selection, mutation, migration and genetic drift. Wright also made major contributions to mammalian and biochemical genetics.

== Biography ==
Sewall Wright was born in Melrose, Massachusetts, to Philip Green Wright and Elizabeth Quincy Sewall Wright. His parents were first cousins, an interesting fact in light of Wright's later research on inbreeding. The family moved three years later after Philip accepted a teaching job at Lombard College, a Universalist college in Galesburg, Illinois.

As a child, Wright helped his father and brother print and publish an early book of poems by his father's student Carl Sandburg. At the age of seven, in 1897, he wrote his first "book", entitled Wonders of Nature, and he published his last paper in 1988: he can be claimed, therefore, to be the scientist with the longest career of science writing. Wright's astonishing maturity at the age of seven may be judged from the following excerpt quoted in the obituary:

Have you ever examined the gizzard of a fowl? The gizzard of a fowl is a deep red colar with blu at the top. First on the outside is a very thick muscle. Under this is a white and fleecy layer. Holding very tight to the other. I expect you know that chickens eat sand. The next two layers are rough and rumply. These layers hold the sand. They grind the food. One night when we had company we had chicken-pie. Our Aunt Polly cut open the gizzard, and in it we found a lot of grain, and some corn.

He was the oldest of three gifted brothers—the others being the aeronautical engineer Theodore Paul Wright and the political scientist Quincy Wright. From an early age Wright had a love and talent for mathematics and biology. Wright attended Galesburg High School and graduated in 1906. He then enrolled in Lombard College where his father taught, to study mathematics. He was influenced greatly by Professor Wilhelmine Key, one of the first women to receive a Ph.D. in biology. Wright received his Ph.D. from Harvard University, where he worked at the Bussey Institute with the pioneering mammalian geneticist William Ernest Castle investigating the inheritance of coat colors in mammals. He worked for the U.S. Department of Agriculture until 1925, when he joined the Department of Zoology at the University of Chicago. He remained there until his retirement in 1955, when he moved to the University of Wisconsin–Madison. He received many honors in his long career, including the National Medal of Science (1966), the Balzan Prize (1984), and the Darwin Medal of the Royal Society (1980). He was a member of the National Academy of Sciences, the American Philosophical Society, the American Academy of Arts and Sciences, and a Foreign Member of the Royal Society. The American Mathematical Society selected him as the Josiah Willards Gibbs lecturer for 1941. For his work on genetics of evolutionary processes, Wright was awarded the Daniel Giraud Elliot Medal from the National Academy of Sciences in 1945.

He died in Madison, Wisconsin, on March 3, 1988.

=== Family ===
Wright married Louise Lane Williams (1895–1975) in 1921. They had three children: Richard, Robert, and Elizabeth.

Sewall Wright worshipped as a Unitarian.

== Scientific achievements and credits ==
=== Population genetics ===
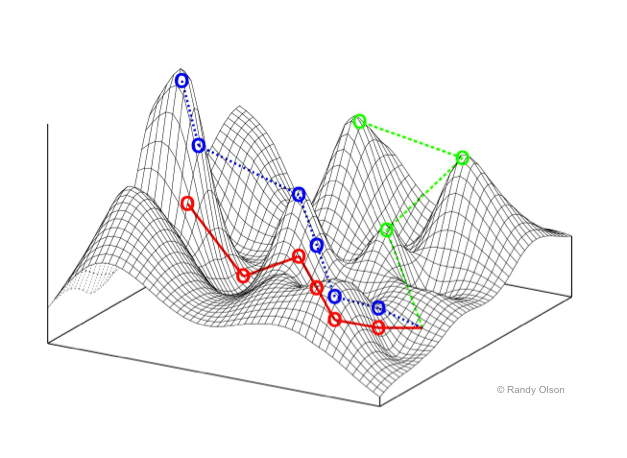
Visualization of a fitness landscape. The X and Y axes represent continuous phenotypic traits, and the height at each point represents the corresponding organism's fitness. The arrows represent various mutational paths that the population could follow while evolving on the fitness landscape.

His papers on inbreeding, mating systems, and genetic drift make him a principal founder of theoretical population genetics, along with R. A. Fisher and J. B. S. Haldane. Their theoretical work is the origin of the modern evolutionary synthesis or neo-Darwinian synthesis. Wright was the inventor/discoverer of the inbreeding coefficient and F-statistics, standard tools in population genetics. He was the chief developer of the mathematical theory of genetic drift, which is sometimes known as the Sewall Wright effect, cumulative stochastic changes in gene frequencies that arise from random births, deaths, and Mendelian segregations in reproduction. In this work he also introduced the concept of effective population size. Wright was convinced that the interaction of genetic drift and the other evolutionary forces was important in the process of adaptation. He described the relationship between genotype or phenotype and fitness as fitness surfaces or evolutionary landscapes. On these landscapes mean population fitness was the height, plotted against horizontal axes representing the allele frequencies or the average phenotypes of the population. Natural selection would lead to a population climbing the nearest peak, while genetic drift would cause random wandering. He did not accept Fisher's genetic theory of dominance, but instead considered it to arise from biochemical considerations. Although set aside for many years, his interpretation is at the basis of modern ideas of dominance.

=== Evolutionary theory ===
Wright's explanation for stasis was that organisms come to occupy adaptive peaks. In order to evolve to another, higher peak, the species would first have to pass through a valley of maladaptive intermediate stages. This could happen by genetic drift if the population is small enough. If a species was divided into small populations, some could find higher peaks. If there was some gene flow between the populations, these adaptations could spread to the rest of the species. This was Wright's shifting balance theory of evolution. There has been much skepticism among evolutionary biologists as to whether these rather delicate conditions hold often in natural populations. Wright had a long-standing and bitter debate about this with R. A. Fisher, who felt that most populations in nature were too large for these effects of genetic drift to be important.

=== Path analysis ===
Wright's statistical method of path analysis, which he invented in 1921 and which was one of the first methods using a graphical model, is still widely used in social science. He was a hugely influential reviewer of manuscripts, as one of the most frequent reviewers for Genetics.

=== Plant and animal breeding ===
Wright strongly influenced Jay Lush, who was the most influential figure in introducing quantitative genetics into animal and plant breeding. From 1915 to 1925 Wright was employed by the Animal Husbandry Division of the U.S. Bureau of Animal Husbandry. His main project was to investigate the inbreeding that had occurred in the artificial selection that resulted in the leading breeds of livestock used in American beef production. He also performed experiments with 80,000 guinea pigs in the study of physiological genetics. Furthermore he analyzed characters of some 40,000 guinea pigs in 23 strains of brother-sister matings against a random-bred stock. (Wright 1922a-c). The concentrated study of these two groups of mammals eventually led to the Shifting Balance Theory and the concept of "surfaces of selective value" in 1932.

He did major work on the genetics of guinea pigs, and many of his students became influential in the development of mammalian genetics. He appreciated as early as 1917 that genes acted by controlling enzymes. An anecdote about Wright, disclaimed by Wright himself, describes a lecture during which Wright tucked an unruly guinea pig under his armpit, where he usually held a chalkboard eraser: according to the anecdote, at the conclusion of the lecture, Wright absent-mindedly began to erase the blackboard using the guinea pig.

=== Statistics ===
The creation of the statistical coefficient of determination has been attributed to Sewall Wright and was first published in 1921. This metric is commonly employed to evaluate regression analyses in computational statistics and machine learning.

=== Wright and philosophy ===
Wright was one of the few geneticists of his time to venture into philosophy. He found a union of concept in Charles Hartshorne, who became a lifelong friend and philosophical collaborator. Wright endorsed a form of panpsychism. He believed that the birth of the consciousness was not due to a mysterious property of increasing complexity, but rather an inherent property, therefore implying these properties were in the most elementary particles.

== Legacy ==
Wright and Fisher, along with J. B. S. Haldane, were the key figures in the modern synthesis that brought genetics and evolution together. Their work was essential to the contributions of Dobzhansky, Mayr, Simpson, Julian Huxley, and Stebbins. The modern synthesis was the most important development in evolutionary biology after Darwin. Wright also had a major effect on the development of mammalian genetics and biochemical genetics.

Judea Pearl and Dana Mackenzie's The Book of Why (2018) describes the contribution of Wright's work on path analysis and delays in its acceptance by several technical disciplines (specifically statistics and formal causal analysis).

OpenMx has as its icon a representation of Wright's piebald guinea pig.

== Bibliography ==
- Wright, Sewall (1984). Evolution and the Genetics of Populations: Genetics and Biometric Foundations New Edition. University of Chicago Press.
  - vol. 1, Genetic & Biometric Foundations. ISBN 0-226-91038-5
  - vol. 2, Theory of Gene Frequencies. ISBN 0-226-91039-3
  - vol. 3, Experimental Results and Evolutionary Deductions. ISBN 0-226-91040-7
  - vol. 4, Variability within and Among Natural Populations. ISBN 0-226-91041-5
