= Gustave Malécot =

French mathematician

- Born: 28 December 1911; La Grand-Croix, Loire-Atlantique, France
- Died: November 1998 (aged 86); Fayence, Var, France
- Education: École Normale Supérieure, Paris
- Known for: Work on Population genetics
- Scientific career
- Fields: Mathematician
- Workplaces: Lycée de Saint-Étienne; Université de Montpellier; Université de Lyon
- Doctoral advisor: George Darmois

Gustave Malécot (28 December 1911 – November 1998) was a French mathematician whose work on heredity had a strong influence on population genetics.

== Biography ==
Malécot grew up in L'Horme, a small village near St. Étienne in the Loire département, the son of a mining engineer.

In 1935, Malécot obtained a degree in mathematics from the École Normale Supérieure, Paris. He then went on to do a PhD under George Darmois and completed that in 1939. His work focused on R.A. Fisher's 1918 article The Correlation Between Relatives on the Supposition of Mendelian Inheritance.

Between 1940 and 1942, with France under Nazi German occupation, Malécot taught mathematics at the Lyceé de Saint-Étienne. In 1942 he was appointed maître de conférence (lecturer) Université de Montpellier. In 1945 he joined the Université de Lyon, becoming professor of applied mathematics in 1946, a position he held until his retirement in 1981.

Malécot's Coancestry Coefficient, a measure of genetic similarity, still bears his name.

== Bibliography ==
- Gustave Malécot (1969) The Mathematics of Heredity, W. H. Freeman and Company (translated from the 1948 French edition)
- Epperson, Bryan K. (1999) "Gustave Malécot, 1911–1998: Population Genetics Founding Father", Genetics 152, 477-484. link to article
- Nagylaki, Thomas (1989) "Gustave Malécot and the transition from classical to modern population genetics", Genetics 122, 253–268. link to article
- Slatkin, Montgomery & Veuille, Michel (editors) (2002). Modern Developments in Theoretical Population Genetics: the Legacy of Gustave Malécot, Oxford University Press
