= Coefficient of relationship =

Measure of biological relationship between individuals

The coefficient of relationship is a measure of the degree of consanguinity (or biological relationship) between two individuals. The term coefficient of relationship was defined by Sewall Wright in 1922, and was derived from his definition of the coefficient of inbreeding of 1921. The measure is most commonly used in genetics and genealogy. A coefficient of inbreeding can be calculated for an individual, and is typically one-half the coefficient of relationship between the parents.

In general, the higher the level of inbreeding the closer the coefficient of relationship between the parents approaches a value of 1, expressed as a percentage, (Note: strictly speaking, r=1 for clones and identical twins, but since the definition of r is usually intended to estimate the suitability of two individuals for breeding, they are typically taken to be of opposite sex.) and approaches a value of 0 for individuals with arbitrarily remote common ancestors.

== Coefficient of relationship ==
The coefficient of relationship $r$ between two people B and C is obtained by a summation of coefficients calculated for every line by which they are connected to their common ancestors. Each such line connects the two people via a common ancestor, passing through no person who is not a common ancestor more than once. A path coefficient between an ancestor A and an offspring O separated by $n$ generations is given as:

$$p_{AO} = 2^{-n} \cdot \sqrt{\frac{1 + f_A}{1 + f_O}}$$

where $f_A$ and $f_O$ are the coefficients of inbreeding for A and O, respectively.

The coefficient of relationship $r_{BC}$ is now obtained by summing over all path coefficients:

$$r_{BC} = \sum p_{AB} \cdot p_{AC}$$

By assuming that the pedigree can be traced back to a sufficiently remote population of perfectly random-bred stock (f_{A} = 0 for all A in the sum) the definition of r may be simplified to

$$r_{BC} = \sum_p 2^{-L(p)}$$

where p enumerates all paths connecting B and C with unique common ancestors (i.e. all paths terminate at a common ancestor and may not pass through a common ancestor to a common ancestor's ancestor), and L(p) is the length of the path p.

To give an (artificial) example: Assuming that two people share the same 32 ancestors of n = 5 generations ago, but do not have any common ancestors at four or fewer generations ago, their coefficient of relationship would be

$r = 2^n \cdot 2^{-2n} = 2^{-n}$, which for n = 5, is, $2^{-5} = \frac{1}{32}$, equal to 0.03125 or approximately 3%.

People for which the same situation applies for their 1024 ancestors of ten generations ago would have a coefficient of r = 2^{−10} = 0.1%. If follows that the value of r can be given to an accuracy of a few percent if the family tree of both people is known for a depth of five generations, and to an accuracy of a tenth of a percent if the known depth is at least ten generations. The contribution to r from common ancestors of 20 generations ago (corresponding to roughly 500 years in human genealogy, or the contribution from common descent from a medieval population) falls below one part-per-million.

== Human relationships ==
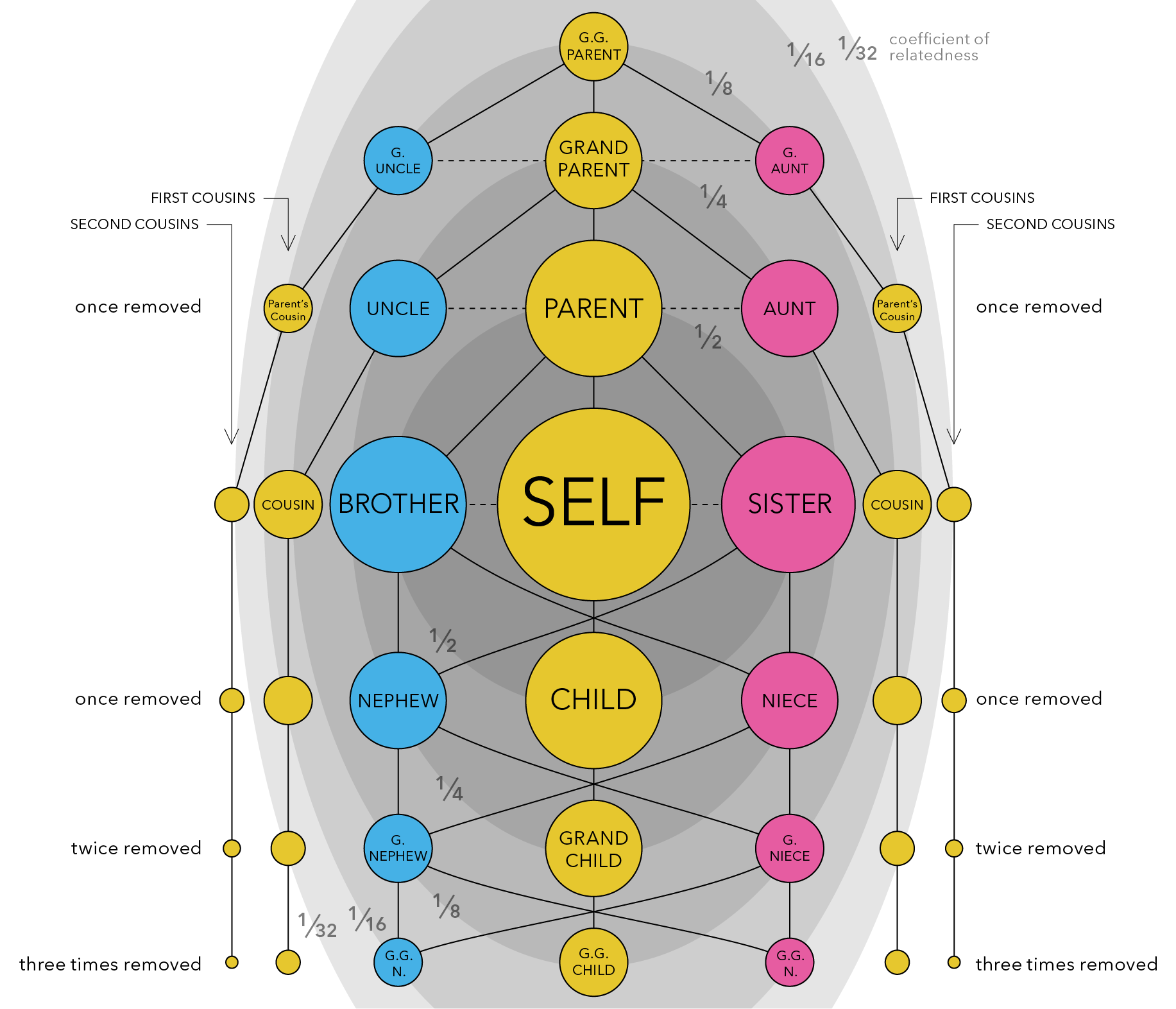
Diagram of common family relationships, where the area of each colored circle is scaled according to the coefficient of relatedness. All relatives of the same relatedness are included together in one of the gray ellipses. Legal degrees of relationship can be found by counting the number of solid-line connections between the self and a relative. (Note: For instance, one's sibling connects to one's parent, which connects to one's self (2 lines) while one's aunt/uncle connects to one's grandparent, which connects to one's parent, which connects to one's self (3 lines).)

The coefficient of relationship is sometimes used to express degrees of kinship in numeric terms in human genealogy.

In human relationships, the value of the coefficient of relationship is usually calculated based on the knowledge of a full family tree extending to a comparatively small number of generations, perhaps of the order of three or four. As explained above, the value for the coefficient of relationship so calculated is thus a lower bound, with an actual value that may be up to a few percent higher. The value is accurate to within 1% if the full family tree of both individuals is known to a depth of seven generations. (Note: A full family tree of seven generations (128 paths to ancestors of the 7th degree) is unreasonable even for members of high nobility. For example, the family tree of Queen Elizabeth II is fully known for a depth of six generations, but becomes difficult to trace in the seventh generation.)

A first-degree relative (FDR) is a person's parent (father or mother), sibling (brother or sister) or child (son or daughter). It constitutes a category of family members that largely overlaps with the term nuclear family, but without spouses. If the persons are related by blood, the first degree relatives share approximately 50% of their genes. First-degree relatives are a common measure used to diagnose risks for common diseases by analyzing family history.

A second-degree relative (SDR) is someone who shares 25% of a person's genes. It includes uncles, aunts, nephews, nieces, grandparents, grandchildren, half-siblings and double-first cousins.

Third-degree relatives are a segment of the extended family and includes first cousins, great-grandparents and great-grandchildren. Third-degree relatives are generally defined by the expected amount of genetic overlap that exists between two people, with the third-degree relatives of an individual sharing approximately 12.5% of their genes. The category includes great-grandparents, great-grandchildren, granduncles, grandaunts, grandnephews, grandnieces, first cousins, half-uncles, half-aunts, half-nieces and half-nephews.

Degree of relationship			Relationship	Coefficient of relationship (r)
Genetics	Roman law	Canon law	Relationship	Coefficient of relationship (r)
0	0	0	self	100% (2^{0})
0	2	1	identical twins	100% (2^{0})
1	1	1	mother / father / daughter / son	50% (2^{−1})
1	3	2	parent's identical twin / identical twin's child	50% (2^{−1})
1	2	1	full sister / full brother	50% (2^{−1})
2	2	2	grandmother / grandfather / granddaughter / grandson	25% (2^{−2})
2	3	2	aunt / uncle / niece / nephew	25% (2^{−2})
3	4	2	first cousin	12.5% (2^{−3})
3	3	3	great-grandmother / great-grandfather / great-granddaughter / great-grandson	12.5% (2^{−3})
3	4	3	grandaunt / granduncle / grandniece / grandnephew	12.5% (2^{−3})
4	5	3	first cousin once removed	6.25% (2^{−4})
5	6	3	second cousin	3.125% (2^{−5})
4	4	4	great-great-grandmother / great-great-grandfather / great-great-granddaughter / great-great-grandson	6.25% (2^{−4})
4	5	4	great-grandaunt / great-granduncle / great-grandniece / great-grandnephew	6.25% (2^{−4})
5	6	4	first cousin twice removed	3.125% (2^{−5})
6	7	4	second cousin once removed	1.5625% (2^{−6})
7	8	4	third cousin	0.78125% (2^{−7})
5	5	5	great-great-great-grandmother / great-great-great-grandfather / great-great-great-granddaughter / great-great-great-grandson	3.125% (2^{−5})
5	6	5	great-great-grandaunt / great-great-granduncle / great-great-grandniece / great-great-grandnephew	3.125% (2^{−5})
6	7	5	first cousin thrice removed	1.5625% (2^{−6})
7	8	5	second cousin twice removed	0.78125% (2^{−7})
8	9	5	third cousin once removed	0.390625% (2^{−8})
9	10	5	fourth cousin	0.1953125% (2^{−9})
2	2	1	half-sister / half-brother	25% (2^{−2})
3	3	2	half-aunt / half-uncle / half-niece / half-nephew	12.5% (2^{−3})
4	4	2	half-first cousin	6.25% (2^{−4})
2	4	2	double-first cousin	25% (2^{−2})
4	4	3	half-grandaunt / half-granduncle / half-grandniece / half-grandnephew	6.25% (2^{−4})
5	5	3	half-first cousin once removed	3.125% (2^{−5})
3	5	3	double-first cousin once removed	12.5% (2^{−3})
6	6	3	half-second cousin	1.5625% (2^{−6})
4	6	3	double-second cousin	6.25% (2^{−4})
3	6	3	quadruple-second cousin	12.5% (2^{−3})
5	5	4	half-great-grandaunt / half-great-granduncle / half-great-grandniece / half-great-grandnephew	3.125% (2^{−5})
6	6	4	half-first cousin twice removed	1.5625% (2^{−6})
4	6	4	double-first cousin twice removed	6.25% (2^{−4})
7	7	4	half-second cousin once removed	0.78125% (2^{−7})
5	7	4	double-second cousin once removed	3.125% (2^{−5})
4	7	4	quadruple-second cousin once removed	6.25% (2^{−4})
8	8	4	half-third cousin	0.390625% (2^{−8})
6	8	4	double-third cousin	1.5625% (2^{−6})
5	8	4	quadruple-third cousin	3.125% (2^{−5})
4	8	4	octuple-third cousin	6.25% (2^{−4})
6	6	5	half-great-great-grandaunt / half-great-great-granduncle / half-great-great-grandniece / half-great-great-grandnephew	1.5625% (2^{−6})
7	7	5	half-first cousin thrice removed	0.78125% (2^{−7})
5	7	5	double-first cousin thrice removed	3.125% (2^{−5})
8	8	5	half-second cousin twice removed	0.390625% (2^{−8})
6	8	5	double-second cousin twice removed	1.5625% (2^{−6})
5	8	5	quadruple-second cousin twice removed	3.125% (2^{−5})
9	9	5	half-third cousin once removed	0.1953125% (2^{−9})
7	9	5	double-third cousin once removed	0.78125% (2^{−7})
6	9	5	quadruple-third cousin once removed	1.5625% (2^{−6})
5	9	5	octuple-third cousin once removed	3.125% (2^{−5})
10	10	5	half-fourth cousin	0.09765625% (2^{−10})
8	10	5	double-fourth cousin	0.390625% (2^{−8})
7	10	5	quadruple-fourth cousin	0.78125% (2^{−7})
6	10	5	octuple-fourth cousin	1.5625% (2^{−6})
5	10	5	sexadecuple-fourth cousin	3.125% (2^{−5})

In a clinical sense, marriage between two family members who have r = 3.125% (2^{−5}) or higher qualifies as consanguineous marriage. Most incest laws concern the relationships where r = 25% (2^{−2}) or higher, although many ignore the rare case of double first cousins. Some jurisdictions also prohibit sexual relations or marriage between cousins of various degree, or individuals related only through adoption or affinity. Whether there is any likelihood of conception is generally considered irrelevant.

== Kinship coefficient ==
The kinship coefficient is a simple measure of relatedness, defined as the probability that a pair of randomly sampled homologous alleles are identical by descent. More simply, it is the probability that an allele selected randomly from an individual, i, and an allele selected at the same autosomal locus from another individual, j, are identical and from the same ancestor.

Relationship	Kinship coefficient
self	1/2
mother / father / daughter / son	1/4
sister / brother	1/4
grandmother / grandfather / granddaughter / grandson	1/8
aunt / uncle / niece / nephew	1/8
first cousin	1/16
half-sister / half-brother	1/8
half-first cousin	1/32
double-first cousin	1/8
Several of the most common family relationships and their corresponding kinship coefficient.

The coefficient of relatedness is equal to twice the kinship coefficient.

=== Calculation ===
The kinship coefficient between two individuals, i and j, is represented as Φ_{ij}. The kinship coefficient between a non-inbred individual and itself, Φ_{ii}, is equal to 1/2. This is due to the fact that humans are diploid, meaning the only way for the randomly chosen alleles to be identical by descent is if the same allele is chosen twice (probability 1/2). Similarly, the relationship between a parent and a child is found by the chance that the randomly picked allele in the child is from the parent (probability 1/2) and the probability of the allele that is picked from the parent being the same one passed to the child (probability 1/2). Since these two events are independent of each other, they are multiplied Φ_{ij} = 1/2 × 1/2 = 1/4.

== See also ==
- Accidental incest
- Effective population size
- F-statistics
- Genetic distance
- Genetic diversity
- Genetic sexual attraction
- Inbreeding
- Coefficient of inbreeding
- Inbreeding avoidance
- Inbreeding depression
- Incest
- Incest taboo
- Legality of incest
- Malecot's method of coancestry
- Pedigree collapse
- Phylogenetics
- Prohibited degree of kinship
- Proximity of blood

== Bibliography ==
- Wright, Sewall (1921). "Systems of Mating" (PDF). Genetics. 6 (2): 111–178. doi:10.1093/genetics/6.2.111. PMC 1200510. PMID 17245958. five papers:
  - I) The biometric relations between offspring and parent
  - II) The effects of inbreeding on the genetic composition of a population
  - III) Assortative mating based on somatic resemblance
  - IV) The effects of selection
  - V) General considerations
- Wright, Sewall (1922). "Coefficients of inbreeding and relationship". American Naturalist. 56 (645): 330–338. Bibcode:1922ANat...56..330W. doi:10.1086/279872. S2CID 83865141.
- Malécot, G. (1948) Les mathématiques de l'hérédité, Masson et Cie, Paris.
- Lange, K. (1997) Mathematical and statistical methods for genetic analysis, Springer-Verlag, New-York.
- Oliehoek, Pieter; Jack J. Windig; Johan A. M. van Arendonk; Piter Bijma (May 2006). "Estimating Relatedness Between Individuals in General Populations With a Focus on Their Use in Conservation Programs". Genetics. 173 (1): 483–496. doi:10.1534/genetics.105.049940. PMC 1461426. PMID 16510792.
