= Malecot's method of coancestry =

Indirect measure of genetic similarity

Malecot's coancestry coefficient, $f$, refers to an indirect measure of genetic similarity of two individuals which was initially devised by the French mathematician Gustave Malécot.

$f$ is defined as the probability that any two alleles, sampled at random (one from each individual), are identical copies of an ancestral allele. In species with well-known lineages (such as domesticated crops), $f$ can be calculated by examining detailed pedigree records. Modernly, $f$ can be estimated using genetic marker data.

== Evolution of inbreeding coefficient in finite size populations ==
In a finite size population, after some generations, all individuals will have a common ancestor : $f \rightarrow 1$. Consider a non-sexual population of fixed size $N$, and call $f_i$ the inbreeding coefficient of generation $i$. Here, $f$ means the probability that two individuals picked at random will have a common ancestor. At each generation, each individual produces a large number $k \gg 1$ of descendants, from the pool of which $N$ individual will be chosen at random to form the new generation.

At generation $n$, the probability that two individuals have a common ancestor is "they have a common parent" OR "they descend from two distinct individuals which have a common ancestor" :

$$f_n = \frac{k-1}{kN} + \frac{k(N-1)}{kN}f_{n-1}$$

What is the source of the above formula? Is it in a later paper than the 1948 Reference.

$$\approx  \frac{1}{N}+ (1-\frac{1}{N})f_{n-1}.$$

This is a recurrence relation easily solved. Considering the worst case where at generation zero, no two individuals have a common ancestor,

$f_0=0$, we get

$$f_n = 1 - (1- \frac{1}{N})^n.$$

The scale of the fixation time (average number of generation it takes to homogenize the population) is therefore

$$\bar{n}= -1/\log(1-1/N) \approx N.$$

This computation trivially extends to the inbreeding coefficients of alleles in a sexual population by changing $N$ to $2N$ (the number of gametes).

== See also ==
- Coefficient of relationship
- Consanguinity
- Genetic distance

== Bibliography ==
- Malécot, G. (1948). Les mathématiques de l'hérédité. Paris: Masson & Cie.
