= Coefficient of inbreeding =

Mathematical estimate of inbreeding

The coefficient of inbreeding (COI) is a number measuring how inbred an individual is. Specifically, it is the probability that two alleles at any locus in an individual are identical by descent from a common ancestor of the two parents. A higher COI will make the traits of the offspring more predictable, but also increases the risk of health issues. In dog breeding, it is recommended to keep the COI less than 5%; however, in some breeds this may not be possible without outcrossing. The average COI for dog breeds is 25%.

== Calculation ==
An individual is said to be inbred if there is a loop in its pedigree chart. A loop is defined as a path that runs from an individual up to the common ancestor through one parent and back down to the other parent, without going through any individual twice. The number of loops is always the number of common ancestors the parents have. If an individual is inbred, the coefficient of inbreeding is calculated by summing all the probabilities that an individual receives the same allele from its father's side and mother's side. As every individual has a 50% chance of passing on an allele to the next generation, the formula depends on 0.5 raised to the power of however many generations separate the individual from the common ancestor of its parents, on both the father's side and mother's side. This number of generations can be calculated by counting how many individuals lie in the loop defined earlier. Thus, the coefficient of inbreeding f of an individual X can be calculated with the following formula:

$$f_X = \sum_N 0.5^{n - 1} \cdot (1 + f_A)$$
where $n$ is the number of individuals in the aforementioned loop,
$N$ is the number of common ancestors (loops),
and $f_A$ is the coefficient of inbreeding of the common ancestor of X's parents.

To give an example, consider the following pedigree.

G is the progeny of C and F, and C is the biological uncle of F.

In this pedigree chart, G is the progeny of C and F, and C is the biological uncle of F. To find the coefficient of inbreeding of G, first locate a loop that leads from G to the common ancestor through one parent and back down to the other parent without going through the same individual twice. There are only two such loops in this chart, as there are only 2 common ancestors of C and F. The loops are G – C – A – D – F and G – C – B – D – F, both of which have 5 members.

Because the common ancestors of the parents (A and B) are not inbred themselves, $f_A = 0$. Therefore the coefficient of inbreeding of individual G is $f_G = (0.5^4 + 0.5^4)\cdot(1+0) = 12.5\%$.

If the parents of an individual are not inbred themselves, the coefficient of inbreeding of the individual is one-half the coefficient of relationship between the parents. This can be verified in the previous example, as 12.5% is one-half of 25%, the coefficient of relationship between an uncle and a niece.

== Iterated sibling mating ==
One simple special case is starting by mating two unrelated parents ("the founders"), but then in each generation mate two siblings from the previous generation. This case may be analysed directly from the loop summation formula. The offspring of the mating of the founders are not inbred (although they have a positive coefficient of relationship); therefore, they may be called "generation 0". (However, note, that this technically makes the founders to "generation −1".)

Thus, the inbreeding coefficient $f_g$ equals 0 for $g=0$ (and for $g=-1$). For any positive integer g, any individual in generation g, and any generation h earlier than the parents of that individual, there are exactly $2^{g-h-1}$ loops through that individual connecting to an 'earliest common common ancestor' of generation h; and each such loop contains in total $2(g-h)-1$ ancestors.

The inbreeding coefficient $f_g$ for this individual may be calculated recursively:

$$f_g = \sum_{h=-1}^{g-2} 2^{g-h-1} 2^{-(2(g-h)-1)} (1+f_h) = \sum_h 2^{-(g-h)} (1+f_h) = \sum_{i=2}^{g+1} 0.5^i (1+f_{g-i})\,.$$

(The simplifications employ some exponentiation rules, and substituting i for $g-h$.) This can be expressed in closed form as

$$f_g=\frac{1}{5} 2^{-2 g-1} \left(\left(2 \sqrt{5}-5\right) \left(1-\sqrt{5}\right)^g+5\times\ 2^{2 g+1}-\left(2 \sqrt{5}+5\right) \left(\sqrt{5}+1\right)^g\right).$$

In other words, we get $f_1 = 0.5^2 = 0.25$, $f_2 = 0.5^2+0.5^3 = 0.375$, $f_3 = 0.5^2\cdot0.25 + 0.5^3 + 0.5^4 = 0.5$, and so on. Expressing the coefficients as rounded percents yields the following table:

Coefficients of inbreeding for repeated generations of sibling mating
Generations	Coefficient of inbreeding (f)
1	25%
2	37.5%
3	50%
4	59.375%
5	67.1875%
6	73.4375%
7	78.5156%
8	82.6172%
9	85.9375%
10	88.623%
11	90.7959%
12	92.5537%
13	93.9758%
14	95.1263%
15	96.0571%
16	96.8102%
17	97.4194%
18	97.9122%
19	98.3109%
20	98.6335%^{A}

^A After 20 generations, the individuals are considered to be part of an inbred strain. Experiments in mice have shown some heterozygosity can still be measured until the 40th generation.

== See also ==
- Coefficient of relationship
- F-statistics
- Hardy–Weinberg principle
- QST (genetics)
