= Genetic diversity =

Total number of genetic characteristics in a species

A graphical representation of the typical human karyotype.

Genetic diversity is the total number of genetic characteristics in the genetic makeup of a species. It ranges widely, from the number of species to differences within species, and can be correlated to the span of survival for a species. It is distinguished from genetic variability, which describes the tendency of genetic characteristics to vary.

Genetic diversity serves as a way for populations to adapt to changing environments. With more variation, it is more likely that some individuals in a population will possess variations of alleles that are suited for the environment. Those individuals are more likely to survive to produce offspring bearing that allele. The population will continue for more generations because of the success of these individuals.

The academic field of population genetics includes several hypotheses and theories regarding genetic diversity. The neutral theory of evolution proposes that diversity is the result of the accumulation of neutral substitutions. Diversifying selection is the hypothesis that two subpopulations of a species live in different environments that select for different alleles at a particular locus. This may occur, for instance, if a species has a large range relative to the mobility of individuals within it. Frequency-dependent selection is the hypothesis that as alleles become more common, they become more vulnerable. This occurs in host–pathogen interactions, where a high frequency of a defensive allele among the host means that it is more likely that a pathogen will spread if it is able to overcome that allele.

== Within-species diversity ==
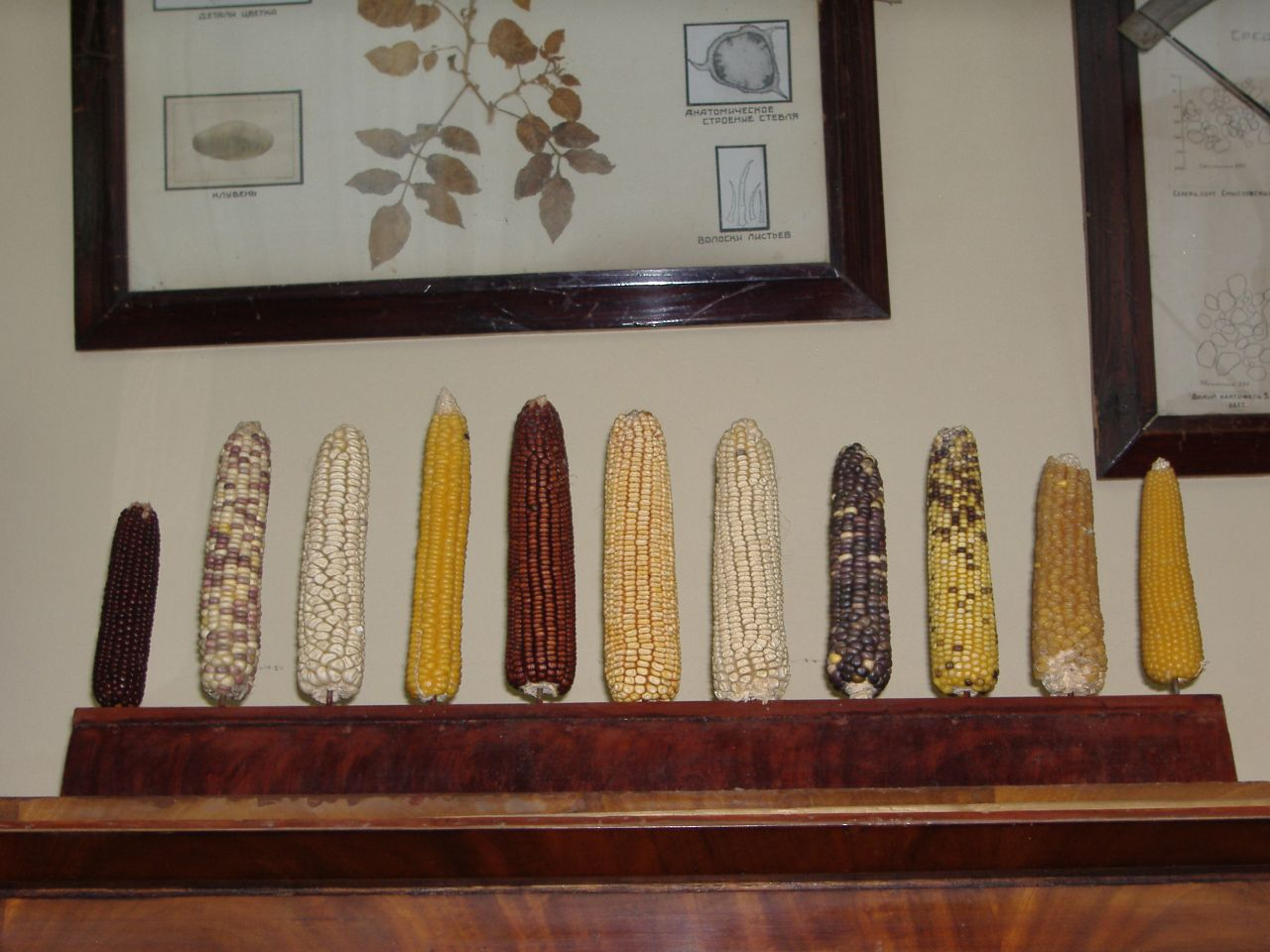
Varieties of maize in the office of the Russian plant geneticist Nikolai Vavilov

A study conducted by the National Science Foundation in 2007 found that genetic diversity (within-species diversity) and biodiversity are dependent upon each other — i.e. that diversity within a species is necessary to maintain diversity among species, and vice versa. According to the lead researcher in the study, Dr. Richard Lankau, "If any one type is removed from the system, the cycle can break down, and the community becomes dominated by a single species." Genotypic and phenotypic diversity have been found in all species at the protein, DNA, and organismal levels; in nature, this diversity is nonrandom, heavily structured, and correlated with environmental variation and stress.

The interdependence between genetic and species diversity is delicate. Changes in species diversity lead to changes in the environment, leading to adaptation of the remaining species. Changes in genetic diversity, such as in loss of species, lead to a loss of biological diversity. Loss of genetic diversity in domestic animal populations has also been studied and attributed to the extension of markets and economic globalization.

== Neutral and adaptive genetic diversity ==
Neutral genetic diversity consists of genes that do not increase fitness and are not responsible for adaptability. Natural selection does not act on these neutral genes. Adaptive genetic diversity consists of genes that increase fitness and are responsible for adaptability to changes in the environment. Adaptive genes are responsible for ecological, morphological, and behavioral traits. Natural selection acts on adaptive genes which allows the organisms to evolve. The rate of evolution on adaptive genes is greater than on neutral genes due to the influence of selection. However, it has been difficult to identify alleles for adaptive genes and thus adaptive genetic diversity is most often measured indirectly. For example, heritability can be measured as $h^2=V_A/V_P$ or adaptive population differentiation can be measured as $Q_{ST}=V_G/(V_G+2V_A)$. It may be possible to identify adaptive genes through genome-wide association studies by analyzing genomic data at the population level.

Identifying adaptive genetic diversity is important for conservation because the adaptive potential of a species may dictate whether it survives or becomes extinct, especially as the climate changes. This is magnified by a lack of understanding whether low neutral genetic diversity is correlated with high genetic drift and high mutation load. In a review of current research, Teixeira and Huber (2021), discovered some species, such as those in the genus Arabidopsis, appear to have high adaptive potential despite suffering from low genetic diversity overall due to severe bottlenecks. Therefore species with low neutral genetic diversity may possess high adaptive genetic diversity, but since it is difficult to identify adaptive genes, a measurement of overall genetic diversity is important for planning conservation efforts and a species that has experienced a rapid decline in genetic diversity may be highly susceptible to extinction.

== Evolutionary importance of genetic diversity ==
=== Adaptation ===
Variation in the populations gene pool allows natural selection to act upon traits that allow the population to adapt to changing environments. Selection for or against a trait can occur with changing environment – resulting in an increase in genetic diversity (if a new mutation is selected for and maintained) or a decrease in genetic diversity (if a disadvantageous allele is selected against). Hence, genetic diversity plays an important role in the survival and adaptability of a species. The capability of the population to adapt to the changing environment will depend on the presence of the necessary genetic diversity. The more genetic diversity a population has, the more likelihood the population will be able to adapt and survive. Conversely, the vulnerability of a population to changes, such as climate change or novel diseases will increase with reduction in genetic diversity. For example, the inability of koalas to adapt to fight Chlamydia and the koala retrovirus (KoRV) has been linked to the koala's low genetic diversity. This low genetic diversity also has geneticists concerned for the koalas' ability to adapt to climate change and human-induced environmental changes in the future.

=== Small populations ===
Large populations are more likely to maintain genetic material and thus generally have higher genetic diversity. Small populations are more likely to experience the loss of diversity over time by random chance, which is an example of genetic drift. When an allele (variant of a gene) drifts to fixation, the other allele at the same locus is lost, resulting in a loss in genetic diversity. In small population sizes, inbreeding, or mating between individuals with similar genetic makeup, is more likely to occur, thus perpetuating more common alleles to the point of fixation, thus decreasing genetic diversity. Concerns about genetic diversity are therefore especially important with large mammals due to their small population size and high levels of human-caused population effects.^{[16]}

A genetic bottleneck can occur when a population goes through a period of low number of individuals, resulting in a rapid decrease in genetic diversity. Even with an increase in population size, the genetic diversity often continues to be low if the entire species began with a small population, since beneficial mutations (see below) are rare, and the gene pool is limited by the small starting population. This is an important consideration in the area of conservation genetics, when working toward a rescued population or species that is genetically healthy.

=== Mutation ===
Random mutations consistently generate genetic variation. A mutation will increase genetic diversity in the short term, as a new gene is introduced to the gene pool. However, the persistence of this gene is dependent of drift and selection (see above). Most new mutations either have a neutral or negative effect on fitness, while some have a positive effect. A beneficial mutation is more likely to persist and thus have a long-term positive effect on genetic diversity. Mutation rates differ across the genome, and larger populations have greater mutation rates. In smaller populations a mutation is less likely to persist because it is more likely to be eliminated by drift.

=== Gene flow ===
Gene flow, often by migration, is the movement of genetic material (for example by pollen in the wind, or the migration of a bird). Gene flow can introduce novel alleles to a population. These alleles can be integrated into the population, thus increasing genetic diversity.

For example, an insecticide-resistant mutation arose in Anopheles gambiae African mosquitoes. Migration of some A. gambiae mosquitoes to a population of Anopheles coluzziin mosquitoes resulted in a transfer of the beneficial resistance gene from one species to the other. The genetic diversity was increased in A. gambiae by mutation and in A. coluzziin by gene flow.

== In agriculture ==
=== In crops ===
When humans initially started farming, they used selective breeding to pass on desirable traits of the crops while omitting the undesirable ones. Selective breeding leads to monocultures: entire farms of nearly genetically identical plants. Little to no genetic diversity makes crops extremely susceptible to widespread disease; bacteria morph and change constantly and when a disease-causing bacterium changes to attack a specific genetic variation, it can easily wipe out vast quantities of the species. If the genetic variation that the bacterium is best at attacking happens to be that which humans have selectively bred to use for harvest, the entire crop will be wiped out.

The nineteenth-century Great Famine in Ireland was caused in part by a lack of biodiversity. Since new potato plants do not come as a result of reproduction, but rather from pieces of the parent plant, no genetic diversity is developed, and the entire crop is essentially a clone of one potato, it is especially susceptible to an epidemic. In the 1840s, much of Ireland's population depended on potatoes for food. They planted namely the "lumper" variety of potato, which was susceptible to a rot-causing oomycete called Phytophthora infestans. The fungus destroyed the vast majority of the potato crop, and left one million people to starve to death.

Genetic diversity in agriculture does not only relate to disease, but also herbivores. Similarly, to the above example, monoculture agriculture selects for traits that are uniform throughout the plot. If this genotype is susceptible to certain herbivores, this could result in the loss of a large portion of the crop. One way farmers get around this is through inter-cropping. By planting rows of unrelated, or genetically distinct crops as barriers between herbivores and their preferred host plant, the farmer effectively reduces the ability of the herbivore to spread throughout the entire plot.

=== In livestock ===
The genetic diversity of livestock species permits animal husbandry in a range of environments and with a range of different objectives. It provides the raw material for selective breeding programmes and allows livestock populations to adapt as environmental conditions change.

Livestock biodiversity can be lost as a result of breed extinctions and other forms of genetic erosion. As of June 2014, among the 8,774 breeds recorded in the Domestic Animal Diversity Information System (DAD-IS), operated by the Food and Agriculture Organization of the United Nations (FAO), 17 percent were classified as being at risk of extinction and 7 percent already extinct. There is now a Global Plan of Action for Animal Genetic Resources that was developed under the auspices of the Commission on Genetic Resources for Food and Agriculture in 2007, that provides a framework and guidelines for the management of animal genetic resources.

Awareness of the importance of maintaining animal genetic resources has increased over time. FAO has published two reports on the state of the world's animal genetic resources for food and agriculture, which cover detailed analyses of our global livestock diversity and ability to manage and conserve them.

== Viral implications ==
High genetic diversity in viruses must be considered when designing vaccinations. High genetic diversity results in difficulty in designing targeted vaccines, and allows for viruses to quickly evolve to resist vaccination lethality. For example, malaria vaccinations are impacted by high levels of genetic diversity in the protein antigens. In addition, HIV-1 genetic diversity limits the use of currently available viral load and resistance tests.

Coronavirus populations have considerable evolutionary diversity due to mutation and homologous recombination. For example, the sequencing of 86 SARS-CoV-2 coronavirus samples obtained from infected patients revealed 93 mutations indicating the presence of considerable genetic diversity. Replication of the coronavirus RNA genome is catalyzed by an RNA-dependent RNA polymerase. During replication this polymerase may undergo template switching, a form of homologous recombination. This process which also generates genetic diversity appears to be an adaptation for coping with RNA genome damage.

== Coping with low genetic diversity ==
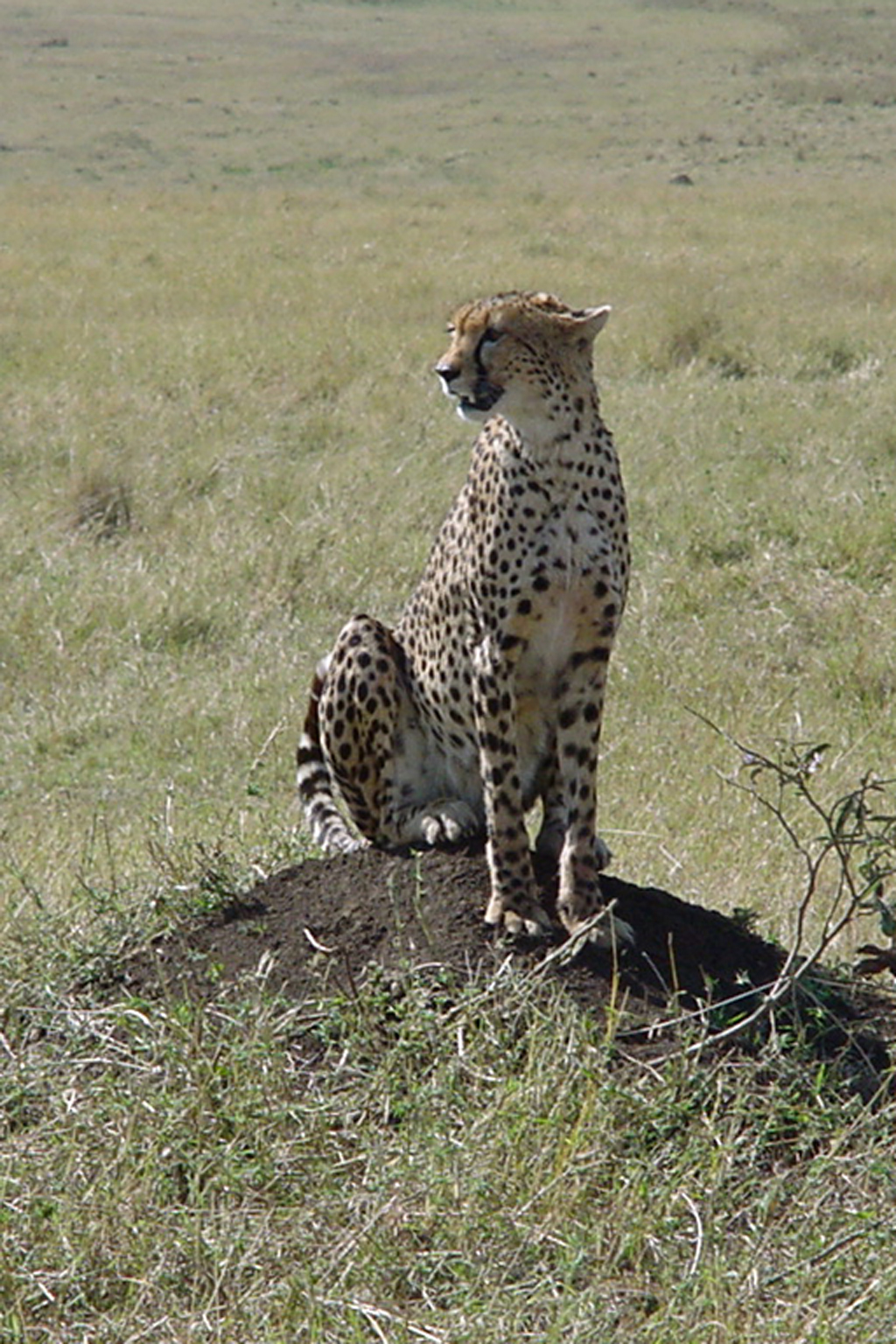
A Tanzanian cheetah.

=== Natural ===
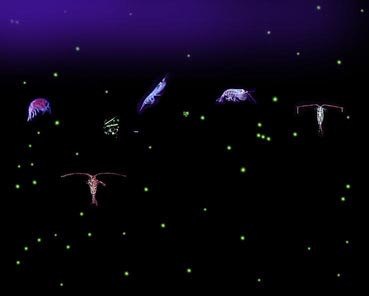
Photomontage of planktonic organisms.

The natural world has several ways of preserving or increasing genetic diversity. Among oceanic plankton, viruses aid in the genetic shifting process. Ocean viruses, which infect the plankton, carry genes of other organisms in addition to their own. When a virus containing the genes of one cell infects another, the genetic makeup of the latter changes. This constant shift of genetic makeup helps to maintain a healthy population of plankton despite complex and unpredictable environmental changes.

Cheetahs are a threatened species. Low genetic diversity and resulting poor sperm quality has made breeding and survivorship difficult for cheetahs. Moreover, only about 5% of cheetahs survive to adulthood. However, it has been recently discovered that female cheetahs can mate with more than one male per litter of cubs. They undergo induced ovulation, which means that a new egg is produced every time a female mates. By mating with multiple males, the mother increases the genetic diversity within a single litter of cubs.

=== Human intervention ===
Attempts to increase the viability of a species by increasing genetic diversity is called genetic rescue. For example, eight panthers from Texas were introduced to the Florida panther population, which was declining and suffering from inbreeding depression. Genetic variation was thus increased and resulted in a significant increase in population growth of the Florida panther. Creating or maintaining high genetic diversity is an important consideration in species rescue efforts, in order to ensure the longevity of a population.

== Measures ==
Genetic diversity of a population can be assessed by some simple measures.

- Gene diversity is the proportion of polymorphic loci across the genome.
- Heterozygosity is the fraction of individuals in a population that are heterozygous for a particular locus.
- Alleles per locus is also used to demonstrate variability.
- Nucleotide diversity is the extent of nucleotide polymorphisms within a population, and is commonly measured through molecular markers such as micro- and minisatellite sequences, mitochondrial DNA, and single-nucleotide polymorphisms (SNPs).

Furthermore, stochastic simulation software is commonly used to predict the future of a population given measures such as allele frequency and population size.

Genetic diversity can also be measured. The various recorded ways of measuring genetic diversity include:

- Species richness is a measure of the number of species
- Species abundance a relative measure of the abundance of species
- Species density an evaluation of the total number of species per unit area

== See also ==
- Biodiversity
- Genetic variance
- Center of diversity
- Genetic variation
- Genetic resources
- Human genetic variation
- Human Variome Project
- International HapMap Project
- Conservation biology
- QST (genetics)
