= Viral evolution =

Subfield of evolutionary biology and virology concerned with the evolution of viruses

Viral evolution is a subfield of evolutionary biology and virology concerned with the evolution of viruses. Viruses have short generation times, and many—in particular RNA viruses—have relatively high mutation rates (on the order of one point mutation or more per genome per round of replication). Although most viral mutations confer no benefit and often even prove deleterious to viruses, the rapid rate of viral mutation combined with natural selection allows viruses to quickly adapt to changes in their host environment. In addition, because viruses typically produce many copies in an infected host, mutated genes can be passed on to many offspring quickly. Although the chance of mutations and evolution can change depending on the type of virus (e.g., double stranded DNA, double stranded RNA, or single stranded DNA), viruses overall have high chances for mutations.

Viral evolution is an important aspect of the epidemiology of viral diseases such as influenza (influenza virus), AIDS (HIV), and hepatitis (e.g. HCV). The rapidity of viral mutation also causes problems in the development of successful vaccines and antiviral drugs, as resistant mutations often appear within weeks or months after the beginning of a treatment. One of the main theoretical models applied to viral evolution is the quasispecies model, which defines a viral quasispecies as a group of closely related viral strains competing within an environment.

== Origins ==
=== Three classical hypotheses ===
Studies at the molecular level have revealed relationships between viruses infecting organisms from each of the three domains of life, suggesting viral proteins that pre-date the divergence of life and thus infecting the last universal common ancestor. This indicates that some viruses emerged early in the evolution of life. There is no truly universal genetic feature shared across the entirety of the virosphere; some viruses are entirely unrelated to one another. It can be inferred from this evidence that viruses have arisen multiple times. It has been suggested that new groups of viruses have repeatedly emerged at all stages of evolution, often through the displacement of ancestral structural and genome replication genes.

There are three main classical hypotheses that aim to explain the origins of viruses:

Regressive hypothesis
Viruses may have once been small cells that parasitized larger cells. Over time, genes not required by their parasitism were lost. The bacteria rickettsia and chlamydia are living cells that, like viruses, can reproduce only inside host cells. They lend support to this hypothesis, as their dependence on parasitism is likely to have caused the loss of genes that enabled them to survive outside a cell. This is also called the "degeneracy hypothesis", or "reduction hypothesis".
Cellular origin hypothesis
Some viruses may have evolved from bits of DNA or RNA that "escaped" from the genes of a larger organism. The escaped DNA could have come from plasmids (pieces of naked DNA that can move between cells) or transposons (molecules of DNA that replicate and move around to different positions within the genes of the cell). Once called "jumping genes", transposons are examples of mobile genetic elements and could be the origin of some viruses. They were discovered in maize by Barbara McClintock in 1950. This is sometimes called the "vagrancy hypothesis", or the "escape hypothesis".
Virus-first hypothesis
This is also called the "Co-evolution hypothesis" and proposes that viruses may have evolved from complex molecules of protein and nucleic acid at the same time that cells first appeared on Earth and would have been dependent on cellular life for billions of years. Viroids are molecules of RNA that are not classified as viruses because they lack a protein coat. They have characteristics that are common to several viruses and are often called subviral agents. Viroids are important pathogens of plants. They do not code for proteins but interact with the host cell and use the host machinery for their replication. The hepatitis delta virus of humans has an RNA genome similar to viroids but has a protein coat derived from hepatitis B virus and cannot produce one of its own. It is, therefore, a defective virus. Although hepatitis delta virus genome may replicate independently once inside a host cell, it requires the help of hepatitis B virus to provide a protein coat so that it can be transmitted to new cells. In similar manner, the sputnik virophage is dependent on mimivirus, which infects the protozoan Acanthamoeba castellanii. These viruses, which are dependent on the presence of other virus species in the host cell, are called "satellites" and may represent evolutionary intermediates of viroids and viruses.

=== Later hypotheses ===
- Chimeric-origins hypothesis: Based on the analyses of the evolution of the replicative and structural modules of viruses, a chimeric scenario for the origin of viruses was proposed in 2019. According to this hypothesis, the replication modules of viruses originated from the primordial genetic pool, although the long course of their subsequent evolution involved many displacements by replicative genes from their cellular hosts. By contrast, the genes encoding major structural proteins evolved from functionally diverse host proteins throughout the evolution of the virosphere. This scenario is distinct from each of the three traditional scenarios but combines features of the Virus-first and Escape hypotheses.

One of the problems for studying viral origins and evolution is the high rate of viral mutation, particularly the case in RNA retroviruses like HIV/AIDS. A recent study based on comparisons of viral protein folding structures, however, is offering some new evidence. Fold Super Families (FSFs) are proteins that show similar folding structures independent of the actual sequence of amino acids, and have been found to show evidence of viral phylogeny. The proteome of a virus, the viral proteome, still contains traces of ancient evolutionary history that can be studied today. The study of protein FSFs suggests the existence of ancient cellular lineages common to both cells and viruses before the appearance of the 'last universal cellular ancestor' that gave rise to modern cells. Evolutionary pressure to reduce genome and particle size may have eventually reduced viro-cells into modern viruses, whereas other coexisting cellular lineages eventually evolved into modern cells. Furthermore, the long genetic distance between RNA and DNA FSFs suggests that the RNA world hypothesis may have new experimental evidence, with a long intermediary period in the evolution of cellular life.

Definitive exclusion of a hypothesis on the origin of viruses is difficult to make on Earth given the ubiquitous interactions between viruses and cells, and the lack of availability of rocks that are old enough to reveal traces of the earliest viruses on the planet. From an astrobiological perspective, it has therefore been proposed that on celestial bodies such as Mars not only cells but also traces of former virions or viroids should be actively searched for: possible findings of traces of virions in the apparent absence of cells could provide support for the virus-first hypothesis.

== Evolution ==
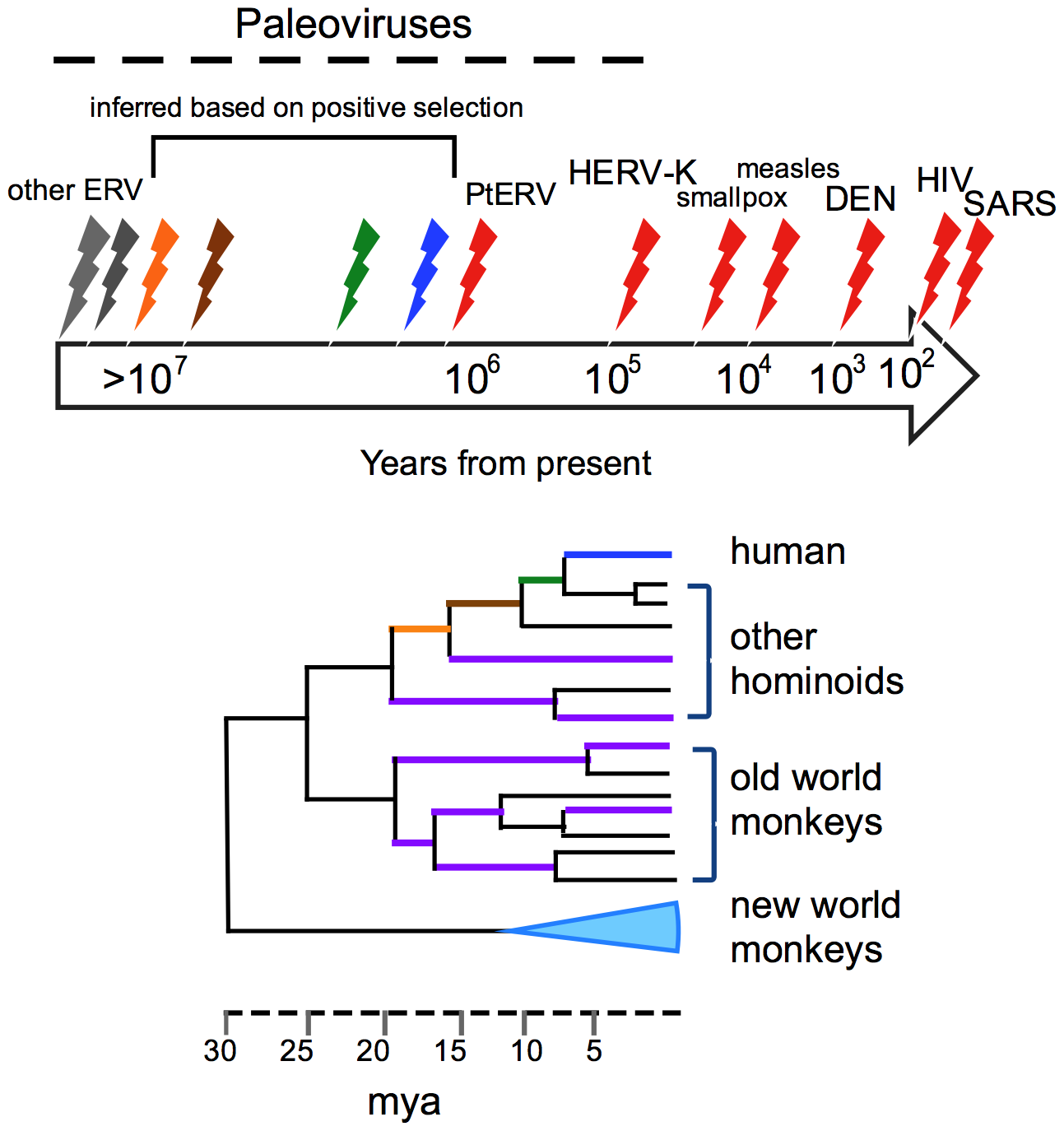
Time-line of paleoviruses in the human lineage

Viruses do not form fossils in the traditional sense as they are much smaller than the finest colloidal fragments forming sedimentary rocks that fossilize plants and animals. However, the genomes of many organisms contain endogenous viral elements (EVEs). These DNA sequences are the remnants of ancient virus genes and genomes that ancestrally 'invaded' the host germline and were subsequently endogenized. For example, the genomes of most vertebrate species contain hundreds to thousands of sequences derived from ancient retroviruses. These sequences are a valuable source of retrospective evidence about the evolutionary history of viruses, and have given birth to the science of paleovirology.

The evolutionary history of viruses can to some extent be inferred from analysis of contemporary viral genomes. The mutation rates for many viruses have been measured, and application of a molecular clock allows dates of divergence to be inferred.

Viruses evolve through changes in their RNA (or DNA), some quite rapidly, and the best adapted mutants quickly outnumber their less fit counterparts. In this sense their evolution is Darwinian. The way viruses reproduce in their host cells makes them particularly susceptible to the genetic changes that help to drive their evolution. The RNA viruses are especially prone to mutations. In host cells there are mechanisms for correcting mistakes when DNA replicates and these kick in whenever cells divide. These important mechanisms prevent potentially lethal mutations from being passed on to offspring. But these mechanisms do not work for RNA and when an RNA virus replicates in its host cell, changes in their genes are occasionally introduced in error, some of which are lethal. One virus particle can produce millions of progeny viruses in just one cycle of replication, therefore the production of a few "dud" viruses is not a problem. Most mutations are "silent" and do not result in any obvious changes to the progeny viruses, but others confer advantages that increase the fitness of the viruses in the environment. These could be changes to the virus particles that disguise them so they are not identified by the cells of the immune system or changes that make antiviral drugs less effective. Both of these changes occur frequently with HIV.

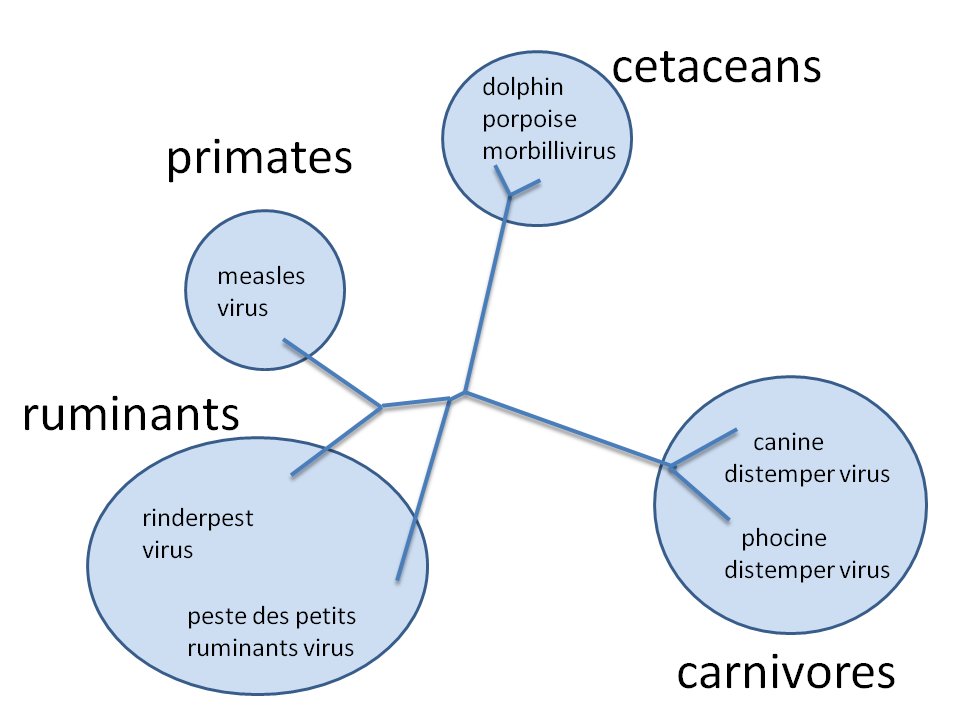
Phylogenetic tree showing the relationships of morbilliviruses of different species

Many viruses (for example, influenza A virus) can "shuffle" their genes with other viruses when two similar strains infect the same cell. This phenomenon is called genetic shift, and is often the cause of new and more virulent strains appearing. Other viruses change more slowly as mutations in their genes gradually accumulate over time, a process known as antigenic drift. Importantly, different viruses can evolve at different rates. For instance, some viruses evolve rapidly, accumulating numerous mutations over time (e.g., HIV), while others evolve more slowly (e.g., GB virus C/hepatitis G virus). Additionally, different genomic regions of a virus can evolve at different rates due to varying selective pressures. For example, this was observed in SARS-CoV-2, which caused the global world-wide COVID-19 pandemic. Furthermore, the same virus can evolve at different rates in different hosts, and may also show coevolution with the host, indicating adaptation.

Through these mechanisms new viruses are constantly emerging and present a continuing challenge in attempts to control the diseases they cause. Most species of viruses are now known to have common ancestors, and although the "virus first" hypothesis has yet to gain full acceptance, there is little doubt that the thousands of species of modern viruses have evolved from less numerous ancient ones. The morbilliviruses, for example, are a group of closely related, but distinct viruses that infect a broad range of animals. The group includes measles virus, which infects humans and primates; canine distemper virus, which infects many animals including dogs, cats, bears, weasels and hyaenas; rinderpest, which infected cattle and buffalo; and other viruses of seals, porpoises and dolphins. Although it is not possible to prove which of these rapidly evolving viruses is the earliest, for such a closely related group of viruses to be found in such diverse hosts suggests the possibility that their common ancestor is ancient.

=== Bacteriophage ===
Escherichia virus T4 (phage T4) is a species of bacteriophage that infects Escherichia coli bacteria. It is a double-stranded DNA virus in the family Straboviridae (formerly Myoviridae). Phage T4 is an obligate intracellular parasite that reproduces within the host bacterial cell and its progeny are released when the host is destroyed by lysis. The complete genome sequence of phage T4 encodes about 300 gene products. These virulent viruses are among the largest, most complex viruses that are known and one of the best studied model organisms. They have played a key role in the development of virology and molecular biology. The numbers of reported genetic homologies between phage T4 and bacteria and between phage T4 and eukaryotes are similar suggesting that phage T4 shares ancestry with both bacteria and eukaryotes and has about equal similarity to each. Phage T4 may have diverged in evolution from a common ancestor of bacteria and eukaryotes or from an early evolved member of either lineage. Most of the phage genes showing homology with bacteria and eukaryotes encode enzymes acting in the ubiquitous processes of DNA replication, DNA repair, recombination and nucleotide synthesis. These processes likely evolved very early. The adaptive features of the enzymes catalyzing these early processes may have been maintained in the phage T4, bacterial, and eukaryotic lineages because they were established well-tested solutions to basic functional problems by the time these lineages diverged.

== Transmission ==
Viruses have been able to continue their infectious existence due to evolution. Their rapid mutation rates and natural selection has given viruses the advantage to continue to spread. One way that viruses have been able to spread is with the evolution of virus transmission. The virus can find a new host through:

- Droplet transmission: the virus is spread to a new host through bodily fluids (an example is the influenza virus)
- Airborne transmission: the virus is passed on through the air (an example is viral meningitis)
- Vector transmission: the virus is picked up by a carrier and brought to a new host (an example is viral encephalitis)
- Waterborne transmission: the virus leaves a host and enters the water, where a new host consumes the water (an example is the poliovirus)
- Sit-and-wait-transmission: the virus is living outside a host for long periods of time (an example is the smallpox virus)

Virulence, or the harm that the virus does on its host, depends on various factors. In particular, the method of transmission tends to affect how the level of virulence will change over time. Viruses that transmit through vertical transmission (transmission to the offspring of the host) will evolve to have lower levels of virulence. Viruses that transmit through horizontal transmission (transmission between members of the same species that don't have a parent-child relationship) will usually evolve to have a higher virulence.

== See also ==
- DNA virus
- Earliest known life forms
- Evolution of the Sacbrood Virus
- RNA virus
- Virus classification
- Viral decay acceleration
- Viral phylodynamics
- Viral quasispecies
- Endothelial cell tropism

== Bibliography ==
- Barrett TC, Pastoret PP, Taylor WJ (2006). Rinderpest and peste des petits ruminants: virus plagues of large and small ruminants. Elsevier. ISBN 0-12-088385-6.
- Leppard K, Dimmock N, Easton A (2007). Introduction to Modern Virology. Blackwell. ISBN 978-1-4051-3645-7. OCLC 65207057.
- Mahy W, Van Regenmortel MH, eds. (2009). Desk Encyclopedia of General Virology. Academic Press. ISBN 978-0-12-375146-1.
- Sussman M, Topley W, Wilson GK, Collier L, Balows A (1998). Topley & Wilson's microbiology and microbial infections. Arnold. ISBN 0-340-66316-2.
