= Doron Lancet =

Israeli geneticist

- דורון לנצט
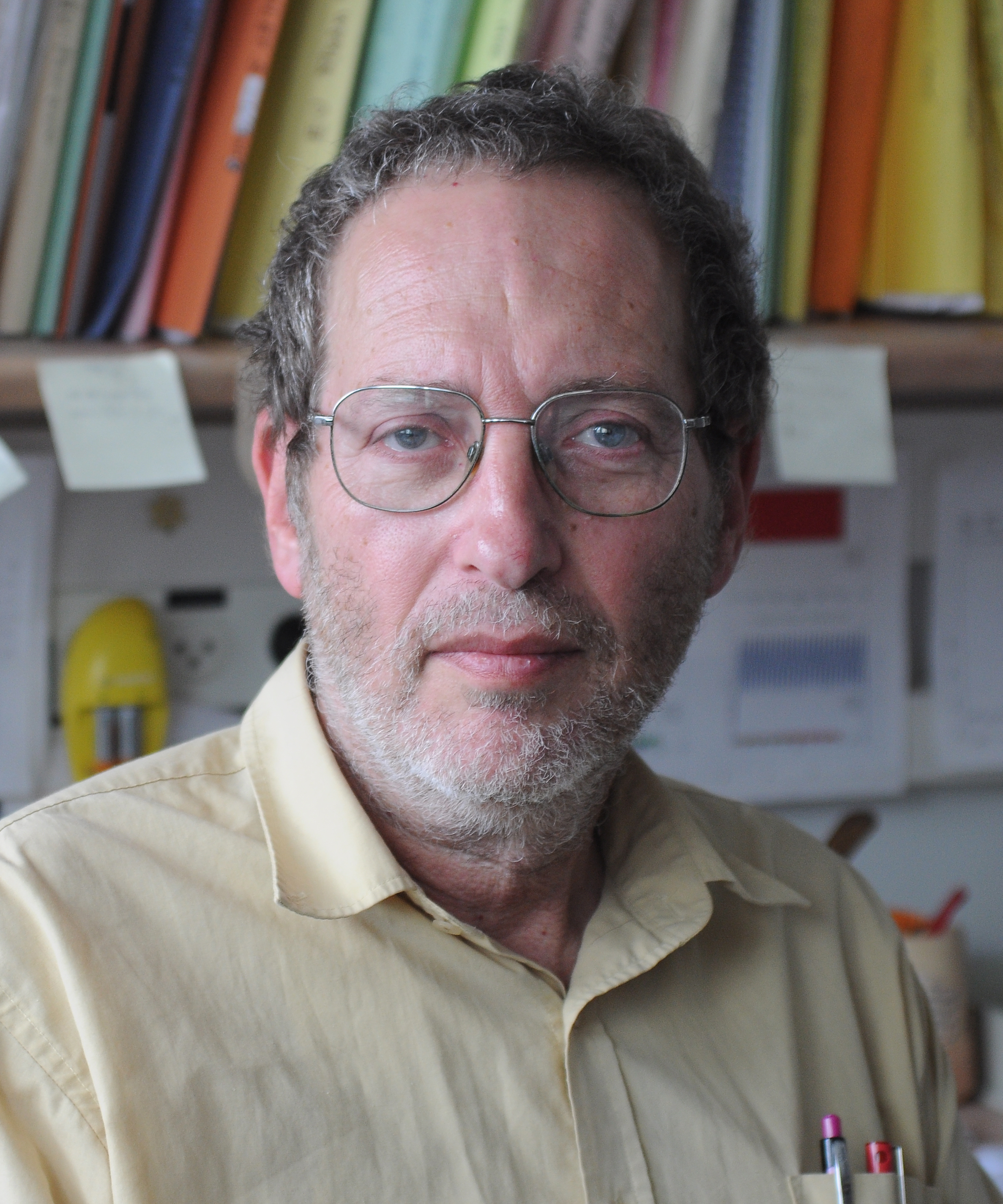
- Doron Lancet
- Education: Hebrew University of Jerusalem; Weizmann Institute of Science
- Known for: Research on olfaction. The Gard model
- Awards: Takasago Award from the Association for Chemoreception Sciences (1986)
- Scientific career
- Fields: Human genetics
- Workplaces: Weizmann Institute of Science
- Thesis: Kinetic and thermodynamic studies of hapten induced conformational changes in immunoglobulins (1978)
- Academic advisors: Israel Pecht; Michael Sela

Doron Lancet (Hebrew: דורון לנצט) is an Israeli human geneticist and computational biochemist. For decades, he was the Ralph D. and Lois R. Silver Professor of Human Genomics, and is currently a Professor Emeritus at the Weizmann Institute of Science. There, he was the founder and long-time head of the Crown Human Genome Center. Lancet is noted for his research on the biochemical and genetic basis of the sense of smell, the development of major human genome databases including GeneCards, and a mathematical chemistry model for the origin of life.

== Education and career ==
Lancet earned a BSc in chemistry and physics from the Hebrew University of Jerusalem and a PhD in chemical immunology from the Weizmann Institute of Science. He completed postdoctoral training in immunology at Harvard University and followed this with research on olfaction at Yale University before returning to the Weizmann Institute. He established the Crown Human Genome Center in 1995, stepping down in 2015.

At the Weizmann Institute, Lancet has held an appointment and headed the Department of Chemical Biology, and later held an appointment in the Department of Molecular Genetics. He has also served on international scientific councils, including the Council of the Human Genome Organization (HUGO) until 2012, and was appointed Editor-in-Chief of the “Origin of Life” section of the journal Life.

== Research ==
=== Olfactory system and Genomics ===
Lancet initially pioneered and discovered the biochemistry of the transducer proteins that subserve the olfactory receptors in the sensory cell membrane. Later, he studied, using genomic capacities, the huge family of the olfactory receptors and analyzed the families of ~900 receptor genes in humans, generating nomenclature for all genes. This work also involved characterizing the large repertoire of olfactory receptor genes in other vertebrate genomes, studying how genetic variation influences phenotypic diversity in human smell perception.

=== GeneCards and Genomic databases ===
Lancet led the development of the GeneCards Suite, a comprehensive, web-based compendium of human genes and associated biomedical information. GeneCards integrates data from numerous public sources and serves as a widely used platform for gene annotation, including diseases, pathways and enhancers for both protein-coding and RNA coding genes.

Lancet’s work also encompasses tools for exploring pathways, disease-gene associations, and gene expression profiles across tissues. For more than 25 years, GeneCards was developed and provided in collaboration with the company LifeMap Inc., which, as of 2026, provides services independently.

=== Origin of life and the GARD model ===
In parallel with genomics research, nearly 30 years, Lancet has developed chemical / computational models addressing the origin of life from non-living matter. He and collaborators advanced the Graded Autocatalysis Replication Domain (GARD) model, a systems chemistry framework in which assemblies of simple molecules (e.g., lipid micelles) can store compositional information and undergo self-reproduction, as well as Darwinian selection, speciation, and evolution. This work offers an alternative to the RNA-centric origin-of-life hypotheses.

== Honors and awards ==
Lancet received national and international awards, including the Israel Biochemical Society’s Hestrin Prize (1986), R.H. Wright Award in Olfactory Research (1998), Takasago Award from the Association for Chemoreception Sciences (1986), Landau Prize for scientific achievement, was elected as a member of the European Molecular Biology Organization (1996), and named a Fellow of the International Society for Computational Biology (2024).

== Selected publications ==
- Pace U, Hanski E, Salomon Y, Lancet D. Odorant-sensitive adenylate cyclase may mediate olfactory reception. Nature 316 (6025), 255–258, 1985
- Lancet D. Vertebrate olfactory reception. Annual Review of Neuroscience 9 (1), 329–355, 1986
- Glusman G, Bahar A, Sharon D, Pilpel Y, White J, Lancet D. The olfactory receptor gene superfamily: data mining, classification, and nomenclature. Mammalian Genome 11 (11), 1016–1023, 2000
- Segré D, Ben-Eli D, Lancet D. Composing life. EMBO Reports 1 (3), 10, 2000
- Segré D, Ben-Eli D, Lancet D. Compositional genomes: prebiotic information transfer in mutually catalytic noncovalent assemblies. Proceedings of the National Academy of Sciences 97 (8), 4112–4117, 2000
- Glusman G, Yanai I, Rubin I, Lancet D. The complete human olfactory subgenome. Genome Research 11 (5), 685–702, 2001
- Segré D, Ben-Eli D, Deamer D, Lancet D. The lipid world. Origins of Life and Evolution of the Biosphere 31 (1), 119–145, 2001
- Menashe I, Man O, Lancet D, Gilad Y. Different noses for different people. Nature Genetics 34 (2), 143–144, 2002
- Gilad Y, Man O, Pääbo S, Lancet D. Human specific loss of olfactory receptor genes. Proceedings of the National Academy of Sciences 100 (6), 3324–3327, 2003
- Olender T, Feldmesser E, Atarot T, Eisenstein M, Lancet D. The olfactory receptor universe, 2004
- Hasin-Brumshtein Y, Lancet D, Olender T. Human olfaction: from genomic variation to phenotypic diversity, 2009
- Safran M, Dalah I, Alexander J, Rosen N, Stein TI, Shmoish M, … Lancet D. GeneCards Version 3: the human gene integrator, 2010
- Rappaport N, Nativ N, Stelzer G, Twik M, Guan-Golan Y, Stein TI, Bahir I, Belinky F, Morrey CP, Safran M, Lancet D. MalaCards: an integrated compendium for diseases and their annotation. Database, Volume 2013, 2013
- Lancet D, Zidovetzki R, Markovitch O. Systems protobiology: origin of life in lipid catalytic networks. Journal of the Royal Society Interface 15 (144), 20180159, 2018
- Kahana A, Lancet D. Self-reproducing catalytic micelles as nanoscopic protocell precursors. Nature Reviews Chemistry 5 (12), 870–878, 2021
- Safran M, Rosen N, Twik M, BarShir R, Stein TI, Dahary D, Fishilevich S, Lancet D. The GeneCards suite. Practical Guide to Life Science Databases, 27–56, 2022
- Kahana A, Segev L, Lancet D. Attractor dynamics drives self-reproduction in protobiological catalytic networks. Cell Reports Physical Science 4 (5), 2023
