= Gard model =

In evolutionary biology, the Graded Autocatalysis Replication Domain (GARD) model is a general kinetic model for homeostatic-growth and fission of compositional-assemblies, with specific application towards lipids.

In the context of abiogenesis, the lipid-world suggests assemblies of simple molecules, such as lipids, can store and propagate information, and thus undergo evolution.

These "compositional assemblies" have been suggested to play a role in the origin of life. The idea is the information being transferred throughout the generations is compositional information – the different types and quantities of molecules within an assembly. This is different from the information encoded in RNA or DNA, which is the specific sequence of bases in such molecule. Thus, the model is viewed as an alternative or an ancestor to the RNA world hypothesis.

== The model ==
The composition vector of an assembly is written as: $v=n_1\cdots n_{N_G}$. Where $n_1\cdots n_{N_G}$ are the molecular counts of lipid type i within the assembly, and NG is how many different lipid types exist (repertoire size).

The change in the count of molecule type i is described by:

$$\frac{dn_i}{dt} = (k_f \rho_i N-k_b n_i) \left(1+\sum_{j=1}^{N_G}\beta_{ij} \frac{n_j}{N}\right)$$

$k_f$ and $k_b$ are the basal forward (joining) and backward (leaving) rate constants, β_{ij} is a non-negative rate enhancement exerted by molecule type j within the assembly on type i from the environment, and ρ is the environmental concentration of each molecule type. β is viewed as a directed, weighted, complex network.

The assembly current size is $N=\sum_{i=1}^{N_G}n_i$. The system is kept away from equilibrium by imposing a fission action once the assembly reaches a maximal size, Nmax, usually in the order of NG. This splitting action produces two progeny of same size, and one of which is grown again.

The model is subjected to a Monte Carlo algorithm based simulations, using Gillespie algorithm.

== Selection ==
In 2010, Eors Szathmary and collaborators chose GARD as an archetypal metabolism-first realization. They introduced into the model a selection coefficient which increases or decreases the growth rate of assemblies depending on how similar or dissimilar they are to a given target. They found that the ranking of the assemblies is unaffected by the selection pressure and concluded that GARD does not exhibit Darwinian evolution.

In 2012, Doron Lancet and Omer Markovitch disputed this. Two major drawbacks of the 2010 paper were: (1) the authors focused on a general assembly and not on a composome or compotype (faithfully replicating and quasispecies, respectively); (2) they performed only a single, random simulation to test the selectability.

== Quasispecies ==
The quasispecies model describes a population of replicators that replicate with relatively high mutations. Due to mutations and back mutations the population eventually centres around a master-replicator (master sequence). GARD's populations were shown to form a quasispecies around a master-compotype and to exhibit an error catastrophe, similarly to classical quasispecies such as RNA viruses.

== See also ==
- Abiogenesis
- Protocell
