= Ruthild Winkler =

Austrian biochemist

Ruthild Winkler-Oswatitsch (born 1941, also known as Ruthild Oswatitsch Eigen) is an Austrian biochemist associated with the Max Planck Institute for Biophysical Chemistry in Germany, and known for two books she coauthored with Nobel prize winner Manfred Eigen. Her research has concerned fast biochemical reactions, game-theoretic models for molecular evolution, and the use of sequence analysis of DNA and RNA in studying the early history of biological evolution.

== Education and career ==
Winkler is the daughter of Klaus Oswatitsch, an Austrian physicist who worked at the Aerodynamics Research Institute in Göttingen at the time of her birth. After World War II, her father moved to Stockholm, where she grew up. She began her studies in chemistry at TU Wien in Austria in 1961, and completed her doctorate there in 1969; her dissertation was Fast complex reactions of alkali ions with biological membrane carriers.

Already before completing her doctorate she had been working with Manfred Eigen at the Max Planck Institute for Biophysical Chemistry in Göttingen, and since 1971 she has been a research scientist there.

== Books ==
In 1975, Eigen and Winkler published Das Spiel: Naturgesetze steuern den Zufall, translated into English by Rita and Robert Kimber as The Laws of the Game: How the principles of nature govern chance (Knopf 1981 and Princeton University Press 1993). They later published Steps Towards Life: A Perspective on Evolution (Oxford University Press 1992).

== Personal life ==
Winkler married Eigen, as his second wife, at a time when they were already long-term research collaborators.
