= Mutation frequency =

Frequency of mutation of genes

Mutation frequency and mutation rates are highly correlated to each other. Tests for mutation frequency are cost effective in laboratories however; these two concepts provide vital information in reference to accounting for the emergence of mutations on any given germ line.

There are several tests utilized in measuring the chances of mutation frequency and rates occurring in a particular gene pool. Some of the test are as follows:

- Avida Digital Evolution Platform
- Fluctuation Analysis

Mutation frequency and rate provide information about how often a mutation may be expressed in a particular genetic group or sex. For example, Yoon et al. (2009), suggested that there were higher sperm mutation frequencies in sperm from older donors. This suggests that males can contribute to genetic disorders of X-linked recessive chromosomes. Evolutionary influences affect mutation frequency and rate. Analyzing the mutation frequency and rates of a particular species may provide a way to understand the genetic component of its longevity

== Aging ==
The time course of spontaneous mutation frequency from middle to late adulthood was measured in four different tissues of the mouse. Mutation frequencies in the cerebellum (90% neurons) and male germ cells were lower than in liver and adipose tissue. Furthermore, the mutation frequencies increased with age in liver and adipose tissue, whereas in the cerebellum and male germ cells the mutation frequency remained constant

Dietary restricted rodents live longer and are generally healthier than their ad libitum fed counterparts. No changes were observed in the spontaneous chromosomal mutation frequency of dietary restricted mice (aged 6 and 12 months) compared to ad libitum fed control mice. Thus dietary restriction appears to have no appreciable effect on spontaneous mutation in chromosomal DNA, and the increased longevity of dietary restricted mice apparently is not attributable to reduced chromosomal mutation frequency.

== See also ==
- Allele frequency
- Mutation
- Mutation rate
