= Mutation rate =

Rate at which mutations occur during some unit of time

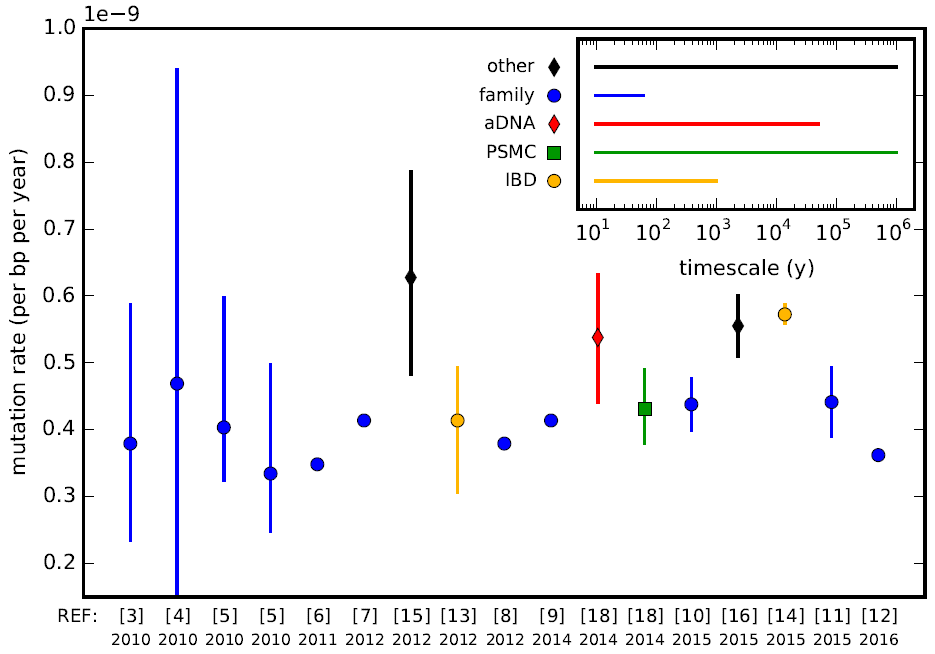
Recently reported estimates of the human genome-wide mutation rate. The human germline mutation rate is approximately 0.5 × 10^{−9} per basepair per year.

In genetics, the mutation rate is the frequency of new mutations in a single gene, nucleotide sequence, or organism over time. Mutation rates are not constant and are not limited to a single type of mutation; there are many different types of mutations. Mutation rates are given for specific classes of mutations. A point mutation is a change to a single base. Missense, nonsense, and synonymous substitution mutations are all examples of point mutations. The rate of these types of substitutions can be further subdivided into a mutation spectrum, which describes the influence of the genetic context on the mutation rate.

There are several natural units of time for each of these rates, with rates being characterized either as mutations per base pair per cell division, per gene per generation, or genome per generation. The mutation rate of an organism is an evolved characteristic and is strongly influenced by the genetics of each organism, in addition to a strong influence from the environment. The upper and lower limits to which mutation rates can evolve is the subject of ongoing investigation. However, the mutation rate does vary over the genome.

When the mutation rate in humans increases, certain health risks can occur, for example, cancer and other hereditary diseases. Having knowledge of mutation rates is vital to understanding the future of cancers and many hereditary diseases.

== Background ==
Different genetic variations of genes within a species are referred to as alleles. Therefore, a new mutation can create a new allele. In population genetics, each allele is characterized by a selection coefficient, which measures the expected change in an allele's frequency over time. The selection coefficient can either be negative, meaning the allele's frequency is expected to decrease; positive, meaning it is expected to increase; or zero, meaning there is no expected change. The distribution of fitness effects of new mutations is an important parameter in population genetics and has been the subject of extensive investigation. Although measurements of this distribution have been inconsistent in the past, it is now generally thought that the majority of mutations are mildly deleterious, that many have little effect on an organism's fitness, and that a few can be favorable.

Because of natural selection, unfavorable mutations will typically be eliminated from a population while favorable changes are generally kept for the next generation, and neutral changes accumulate at the rate they are created by mutations. This process happens by reproduction. In a particular generation, the 'best fit' survives with higher probability, passing their genes to their offspring. The sign of the change in this probability defines mutations to be beneficial, neutral or harmful to organisms.

== Measurement ==
An organism's mutation rates can be measured by a number of techniques.

One way to measure the mutation rate is by the fluctuation test, also known as the Luria–Delbrück experiment. This experiment demonstrated that bacterial mutations occur in the absence of selection rather than in the presence of selection.

This is very important to mutation rates because it proves experimentally that mutations can occur without selection being a component—in fact, mutation and selection are completely distinct evolutionary forces. Different DNA sequences can have different propensities to mutation (see below) and may not occur randomly.

The most commonly measured class of mutations is substitutions, because they are relatively easy to measure with standard analyses of DNA sequence data. However, substitutions have a substantially different rate of mutation (10^{−8} to 10^{−9} per generation for most cellular organisms) than other classes of mutation, which are frequently much higher (~10^{−3} per generation for satellite DNA expansion/contraction).

=== Substitution rates ===
Many sites in an organism's genome may admit mutations with small fitness effects. These sites are typically called neutral sites. Theoretically, mutations under no selection become fixed between organisms at precisely the mutation rate. Fixed synonymous mutations, i.e. synonymous substitutions, are changes to the sequence of a gene that do not change the protein produced by that gene. They are often used as estimates of that mutation rate, even though some synonymous mutations have fitness effects. As an example, mutation rates have been directly inferred from the whole genome sequences of experimentally evolved replicate lines of Escherichia coli B.

=== Mutation accumulation lines ===
A particularly labor-intensive way of characterizing the mutation rate is the mutation accumulation line.

Mutation accumulation lines have been used to characterize mutation rates with the Bateman-Mukai Method and direct sequencing of well-studied experimental organisms ranging from intestinal bacteria (E. coli), roundworms (C. elegans), yeast (S. cerevisiae), fruit flies (D. melanogaster), and small ephemeral plants (A. thaliana).

== Variation in mutation rates ==
Generation time affects mutation rates: The long-lived woody bamboos (tribes Arundinarieae and Bambuseae) have lower mutation rates (short branches in the phylogenetic tree) than the fast-evolving herbaceous bamboos (Olyreae).

Mutation rates differ between species and even between different regions of the genome of a single species. Mutation rates can also differ even between genotypes of the same species; for example, bacteria have been observed to evolve hypermutability as they adapt to new selective conditions. These different rates of nucleotide substitution are measured in substitutions (fixed mutations) per base pair per generation. For example, mutations in intergenic, or non-coding, DNA tend to accumulate at a faster rate than mutations in DNA that is actively in use in the organism (gene expression). That is not necessarily due to a higher mutation rate, but to lower levels of purifying selection. A region which mutates at predictable rate is a candidate for use as a molecular clock.

If the rate of neutral mutations in a sequence is assumed to be constant (clock-like), and if most differences between species are neutral rather than adaptive, then the number of differences between two different species can be used to estimate how long ago two species diverged (see molecular clock). The mutation rate of an organism may change in response to environmental stress. For example, UV light damages DNA, which may result in error-prone attempts by the cell to perform DNA repair.

The human mutation rate is higher in the male germ line (sperm) than the female (egg cells), but estimates of the exact rate have varied by an order of magnitude or more. This means that a human genome accumulates around 64 new mutations per generation because each full generation involves a number of cell divisions to generate gametes. Human mitochondrial DNA has been estimated to have mutation rates of ~3× or ~2.7 × 10^{−5} per base per 20 year generation (depending on the method of estimation); these rates are considered to be significantly higher than rates of human genomic mutation at ~2.5 × 10^{−8} per base per generation. Using data available from whole genome sequencing, the human genome mutation rate is similarly estimated to be ~1.1 × 10^{−8} per site per generation.

The rate for other forms of mutation also differs greatly from point mutations. An individual microsatellite locus often has a mutation rate on the order of 10^{−4}, though this can differ greatly with length.

Some sequences of DNA may be more susceptible to mutation. For example, stretches of DNA in human sperm which lack methylation are more prone to mutation.

In general, the mutation rate in unicellular eukaryotes (and bacteria) is roughly 0.003 mutations per genome per cell generation. However, some species, especially the ciliate of the genus Paramecium have an unusually low mutation rate. For instance, Paramecium tetraurelia has a base-substitution mutation rate of ~2 × 10^{−11} per site per cell division. This is the lowest mutation rate observed in nature so far, being about 75× lower than in other eukaryotes with a similar genome size, and even 10× lower than in most prokaryotes. The low mutation rate in Paramecium has been explained by its transcriptionally silent germ-line nucleus, consistent with the hypothesis that replication fidelity is higher at lower gene expression levels.

The highest per base pair per generation mutation rates are found in viruses, which can have either RNA or DNA genomes. DNA viruses have mutation rates between 10^{−6} to 10^{−8} mutations per base per generation, and RNA viruses have mutation rates between 10^{−3} to 10^{−5} per base per generation.

== Mutation spectrum ==
A mutation spectrum is a distribution of rates or frequencies for the mutations relevant in some context, based on the recognition that rates of occurrence are not all the same. In any context, the mutation spectrum reflects the details of mutagenesis and is affected by conditions such as the presence of chemical mutagens or genetic backgrounds with mutator alleles or damaged DNA repair systems. The most fundamental and expansive concept of a mutation spectrum is the distribution of rates for all individual mutations that might happen in a genome. From this full de novo spectrum, for instance, one may calculate the relative rate of mutation in coding vs non-coding regions. Typically the concept of a spectrum of mutation rates is simplified to cover broad classes such as transitions and transversions (figure), i.e., different mutational conversions across the genome are aggregated into classes, and there is an aggregate rate for each class.

In many contexts, a mutation spectrum is defined as the observed frequencies of mutations identified by some selection criterion, e.g., the distribution of mutations associated clinically with a particular type of cancer, or the distribution of adaptive changes in a particular context such as antibiotic resistance. Whereas the spectrum of de novo mutation rates reflects mutagenesis alone, this kind of spectrum may also reflect effects of selection and ascertainment biases (e.g., both kinds of spectrum are used in).

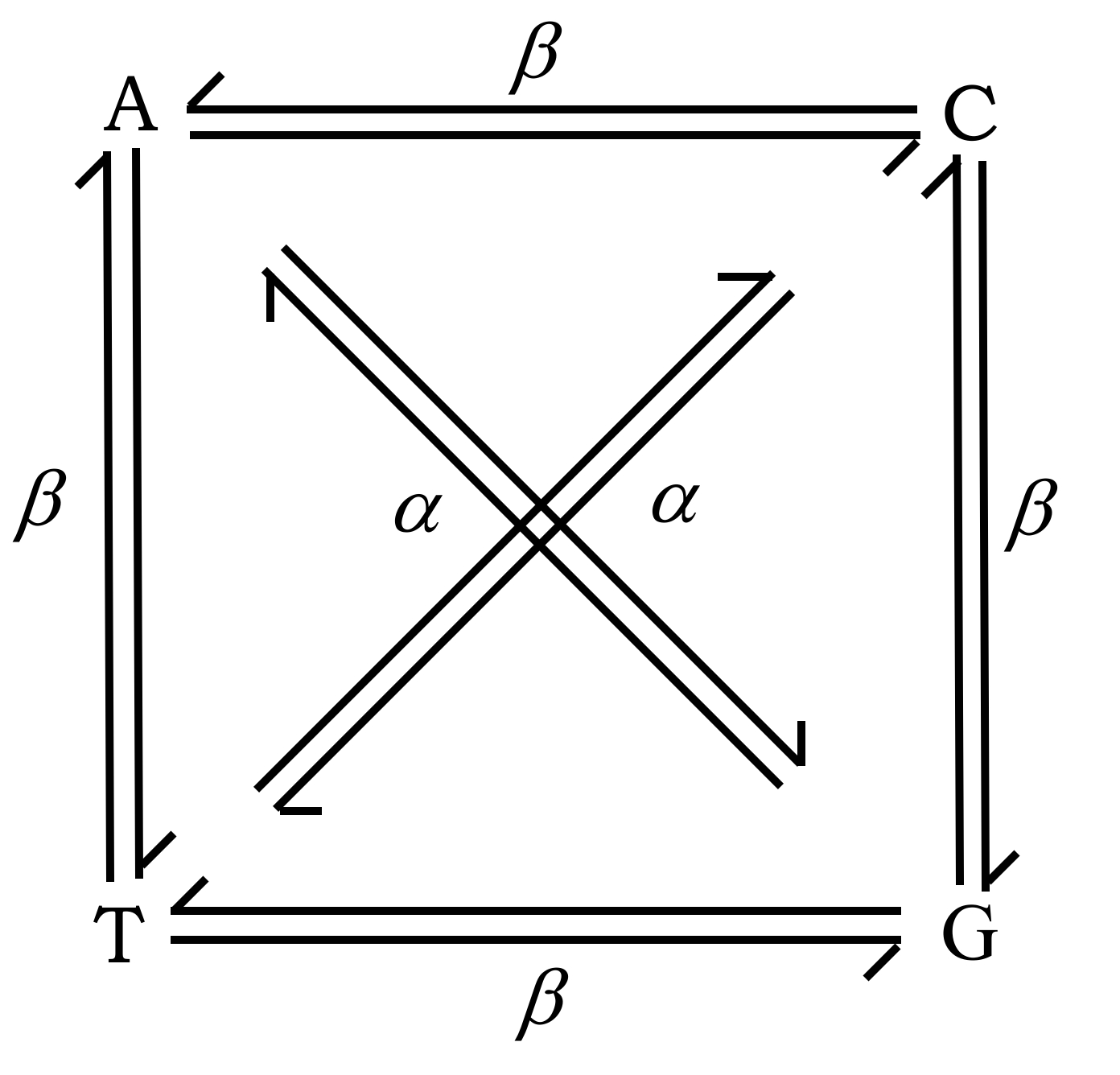
Transitions (Alpha) and transversions (Beta).

== Evolution ==
The theory on the evolution of mutation rates identifies three principal forces involved: the generation of more deleterious mutations with higher mutation, the generation of more advantageous mutations with higher mutation, and the metabolic costs and reduced replication rates that are required to prevent mutations. Different conclusions are reached based on the relative importance attributed to each force. The optimal mutation rate of organisms may be determined by a trade-off between costs of a high mutation rate, such as deleterious mutations, and the metabolic costs of maintaining systems to reduce the mutation rate (such as increasing the expression of DNA repair enzymes. or, as reviewed by Bernstein et al. having increased energy use for repair, coding for additional gene products and/or having slower replication). Secondly, higher mutation rates increase the rate of beneficial mutations, and evolution may prevent a lowering of the mutation rate in order to maintain optimal rates of adaptation. As such, hypermutation enables some cells to rapidly adapt to changing conditions in order to avoid the entire population from becoming extinct. Finally, natural selection may fail to optimize the mutation rate because of the relatively minor benefits of lowering the mutation rate, and thus the observed mutation rate is the product of neutral processes.

Studies have shown that treating RNA viruses such as poliovirus with ribavirin produce results consistent with the idea that the viruses mutated too frequently to maintain the integrity of the information in their genomes. This is termed error catastrophe.

The characteristically high mutation rate of HIV (Human Immunodeficiency Virus) of 3 × 10^{−5} per base and generation, coupled with its short replication cycle leads to a high antigen variability, allowing it to evade the immune system.

== See also ==
- Mutation
- Critical mutation rate
- Mutation frequency
- Dysgenics
- Allele frequency
- Rate of evolution
- Genetics
- Cancer
