= Israel Pecht =

Israeli physical chemist

- ישראל פכט
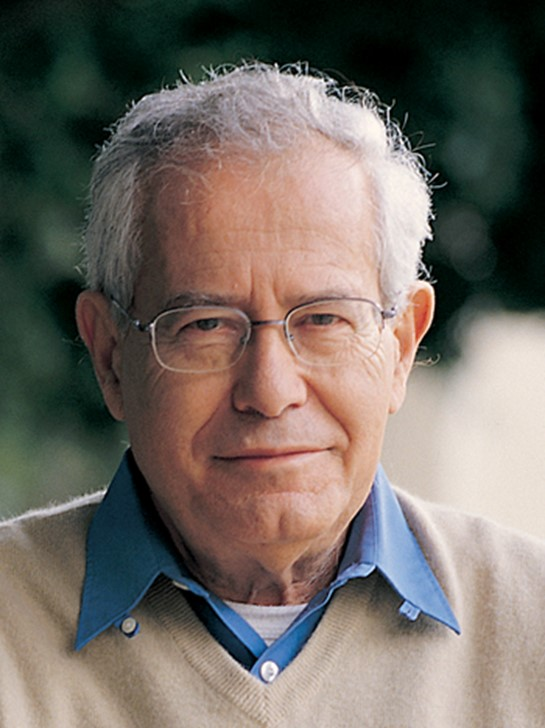
- Born: June 28, 1937 (age 89); Vienna, Austria
- Education: Hebrew University of Jerusalem (M.Sc., 1962); Weizmann Institute of Science (PhD, 1967)
- Occupation: Physical chemist
- Employer: Weizmann Institute of Science
- Known for: Physicochemical processes in living organisms
- Title: Morton and Anne Kleiman Chair in Chemical Immunology (1993–2006)

Israel Pecht (Hebrew: ישראל פכט; born June 28, 1937) is an Israeli physical chemist and Professor Emeritus at the Faculty of Biology at the Weizmann Institute of Science. He is a former Chair of the Academic Board of the Israel Science Foundation and served as President of the International Union for Pure and Applied Biophysics. His research is in the study of physicochemical processes in living organisms.

== Biography ==
=== Early life ===
Israel Pecht was born in Vienna, the son of Yocheved Eva (née Preminger) and Benjamin Isaac (Benno) Pächt. He was named after his maternal grandfather. Israel and his parents immigrated to Mandatory Palestine after the Anschluss, in late 1938. Many of his relatives perished in the Holocaust. He grew up in the Old North of Tel Aviv.

He served in the IDF in the Field Security Unit of the Southern Command and did most of his reserve duty in Lebanon with the IDF Spokesperson’s Unit. After his discharge in 1958, he began his studies towards master's degree in chemistry at the Hebrew University of Jerusalem, completing it in 1962. His thesis work was carried out at the Isotope Research Department of the Weizmann Institute, where he continued with his doctoral studies under the supervision of Prof. Michael Anbar. His Ph.D. dissertation, submitted in 1967, was titled “Redox Processes Between Transition Metal Ions and their Ligands.” During his doctoral studies, Pecht was one of four instructors at the first summer science camp for youth at the Weizmann Institute, alongside Moshe Rishpon, Alpha Peled, and Gideon Zwas.

=== Independent research career ===
Upon completing his PhD, Pecht traveled to Göttingen, West Germany, where he conducted postdoctoral research at the Max Planck Institute for Physical Chemistry under Prof. Manfred Eigen (Nobel Laureate 1967). He was the first Israeli to carry out scientific postdoctoral research in Germany after World War II. Upon returning to Israel in 1970, he was appointed a researcher in the Department of Chemical Immunology at the Weizmann Institute. In 1978, he was appointed Associate Professor and, in 1984, Full Professor. He officially retired in 2006 but continued conducting active research.

Over the years, Pecht was invited to conduct research at institutions such as the University of Konstanz, Max Planck Institute for Biophysical Chemistry in Göttingen, Stanford University, the California Institute of Technology (Caltech), Paris VII University, and the Pasteur and Curie Institutes.

=== Academic and organizational roles ===
In 1974, Pecht was appointed head of the Department of Biological Services at the Weizmann Institute. In the mid-1970s, he served on the Chemistry and Biology teaching committees of the Feinberg Graduate School and headed the Charles Clore Scholars Program in the 1980s. In 1981, together with Prof. Ruth Arnon, he organized the Rothschild Workshop on Biophysical Aspects of Immunology. In 1985, he founded the Minerva Center for Biomembranes Research, which he headed until 1994. He served as Head of the Department of Chemical Immunology from 1989 to 1992 and again from 1998 to 2002 (by then, renamed the Department of Immunology).

From 1986 to 1991, Pecht served as President of the Israel Society for Biochemistry. From 1989 to 1995, he was Chairman of the Academic Board of the Israel Science Foundation, having previously chaired its Division of Natural Sciences. Pecht held senior positions in international organizations: Vice President (1992–1995) and President (1995–1998) of the European Federation of Immunological Societies (EFIS); Vice President (1996–1999) and President (1999–2002) of the International Union for Pure and Applied Biophysics (IUPAB); and Secretary General (2006–2016) of the Federation of European Biochemical Societies (FEBS), where he is now an Honorary Executive Committee Member. He has also served as a consultant to UNESCO, the Max Planck Society, and other academic bodies in West Germany and France, as well as to the Chief Scientist of Israel’s Ministry of Health.

Since 2024, a prestigious annual award named after Pecht has been granted by FEBS.

== Research ==
Over his career, Pecht published around 550 papers and supervised dozens of graduate students, including Prof. Jakub Abramson and Prof. Doron Lancet of the Weizmann Institute, as well as Dr. David Haselkorn, former CEO of Clal Biotechnology. He served as editor of the journal Immunology Letters and contributed editorial work to many other journals in his field.

Pecht’s research focuses on elucidating physicochemical principles underlying biochemical processes, by identifying and characterizing their elementary steps. For example those of transmembrane signaling processes that regulate immune cell activity. His lab became a global center for the biophysical study of molecular processes in immunology, pioneering analysis of antigen interactions of monoclonal antibodies using thermodynamic and kinetic methods. These methods were later applied to the study of conformational changes in T-cell receptors upon binding to target antigens presented on cell membranes.

As a model system, Pecht and his group investigated the activation cascade of mast cells, from the binding of IgE antibodies to their specific cell-surface receptors, through the coupling processes of cell activation, leading finally to the mediators’ secretion response.

In parallel, his lab studied electron transfer processes within and between protein molecules and pioneered the use of pulse-radiation to resolve the mechanisms of reactions in key redox enzymes, such as cytochrome-c oxidase.

In recent years, Pecht has collaborated with Prof. Mudi Sheves and Prof. David Cahen on research aimed at understanding the mechanism of electrical conduction in proteins.

== Honors and awards ==
- Member, European Molecular Biology Organization (EMBO) (1977)
- Jacques Mimran Chair in Chemical Immunology (1980–1992)
- Honorary Member, Swedish Biophysical Society (1980)
- Fairchild Distinguished Visiting Professor, Caltech (1981–1982)
- Schwerin Research Award (1984)
- H. Dudley Wright Achievement Award (1986)
- Morton and Anne Kleiman Chair in Chemical Immunology (1993–2006)
- Henri de Rothschild Fellowship, Curie Institute (1995)
- Honorary Member, Hungarian Society for Immunology (1997)
- Federal Republic of Germany Cross of Merit (1998)
- Honorary Doctorate, Faculty of Medicine, University of Debrecen, Hungary (1999)
- Landau Prize for Life Sciences (2003)
- Honorary Member, Hungarian Academy of Sciences (2007)
- Honorary Member, Spanish Society for Biochemistry and Molecular Biology (SEBBM) (2012)
- Honorary Doctorate, National and Kapodistrian University of Athens (2013)
- Member, Academia Europaea (2016)
- Medal marking the centennial of the Nencki Institute, Polish Academy of Sciences (2017)
- Gold Medal of Charles University in Prague for achievements in biochemistry and immunology (2017)
- Honorary Member, Polish Biochemical Society (2018)

== Personal life ==
Since 1962, Pecht has been married to Dr. Marit Pecht (née Landau), a biochemist who worked for many years at the Weizmann Institute. They had two children, Galit (deceased) and Yuval. He resides in Rehovot.

== Selected publications ==
- J. Schlessinger, I. Z. Steinberg, D. Givol, J. Hochman and I. Pecht (1975) Antigen induced conformational changes in antibodies and the Fab fragments studied by circular polarization of fluorescence. Proc. Natl. Acad. Sci. U.S.A. 72, 2776-2779.
- D. Lancet and I. Pecht (1976) Kinetic evidence for a conformational transition induced in an immunoglobulin by hapten binding. Proc. Natl. Acad. Sci. U.S.A. 73 ,3549-3553.
- I. Munro, I. Pecht and L. Stryer (1979) Sub-nanosecond motions of single tryptophans in proteins. Proc. Natl. Acad. Sci. U.S.A. 76, 56-60.
- R. Sagi-Eisenberg, H. Lieman and I. Pecht (1985) Protein kinase C regulation of the receptor-coupled calcium signal in histamine-secreting rat basophilic leukaemia cells, Nature 313, 59-60.
- O. Farver and I. Pecht (1989) Long-range intramolecular electron transfer in azurins. Proc. Natl. Acad. Sci. 86, 6968-6972.
- E. U. Kubitscheck, M. Kircheis, R. Schweitzer-Stenner, W. Dreybrodt, T.M. Jovin and I. Pecht (1991) Fluorescence resonance energy transfer on single living cells. Biophysical Journal 60 (307-318).
- M.D. Guthmann, M. Tal and I. Pecht (1995) A secretion inhibitory signal transduction molecule on mast cells is another C-type lectin. Proc. Natl. Acad. Sci. USA 92, 9397-9401.
- O. Farver, Y. Lu, M. C. Ang and I. Pecht (1999) Enhanced rate of intramolecular electron transfer in an engineered purple CuA azurin. Proc. Natl. Acad. Sci., USA 96, 899-902.
- D. M. Gakamsky, E. Lewitzki , E. Grell, X. Saulquin B. Malissen, F. Montero-Julian, M. Bonneville and I. Pecht (2007) Kinetic evidence for a ligand-binding-induced conformational transition in the T cell receptor. Proc. Natl. Acad. Sci. USA 104, 16639-44.
- I. Ron, L. Sepunaru, S. Itzhakov, T. Belenkova, N. Friedman, I. Pecht, M. Sheves and D. Cahen (2010) Proteins as electronic materials: electron transport through solid-state protein monolayer junctions. J. Am. Chem. Soc. 132 (12), 4131-40.
