= Bateman-Mukai method =

Method for describing the mutation rates for genes through the observation of phenotypes

In genetics, the Bateman–Mukai method, sometimes referred to as the Bateman–Mukai technique, is a traditional method used for describing the mutation rates for genes through the observation of physical traits (phenotype) of a living organism. The method involves the maintenance of many mutation accumulation lineages of the organism studied, and it is therefore labor intensive.

== Origin ==
The foundational papers from which this method gets its name were conducted by geneticists A. J. Bateman in 1959 and T. Mukai in 1964. Bateman used an early form of this method to understand how radiation affects the survival of chromosomes due to radiation induced mutations. Mukai's experimental design largely followed the design of Bateman's study, but rather than inducing mutations via any external factor, the study aimed to describe the spontaneous naturally occurring deleterious mutation rate of the common fruit fly.

== Procedure ==
The method requires the establishment of many mutation accumulation lineages using within line breeding of diploid organisms. These lines are maintained in a favorable environment for deleterious mutations to accumulate so that they are not to be purged by natural selection: excess food and other resources are kept available to eliminate competition, and the parents of the next generation are chosen at random without any regards to fitness. Importantly, in this way, mutation accumulation experiments attempt to describe the true mutation rates that would be observed in the absence of natural selection.

Asexually reproducing organisms can simply have a single parent selected as the parent for the next generation of each line. In sexually reproducing organisms, measures must be taken such that researchers can be sure that mutations are inherited by future generations of the mutation accumulation lines. The use of a balancer gene can be implemented towards this end. In the Mukai experiment, male flies homozygous for the wild type chromosome 2 were always mated with female heterozygotes for the Pm/Cy balancer gene that produces an observable phenotype in the wings, with homozygous Pm/Cy being lethal. This ensures that researchers can select for organisms that do not exhibit the phenotypic trait of the balancer gene, which in turn means that only wild type chromosomes will be passed down to the next generation. In this way, in sexually reproducing organisms, any spontaneously occurring mutations that occur in the mutation accumulation line should have a random chance, due to the independent assortment, of being fixed in the next generation of the line.

The main measurements that are derived from results of a Bateman–Mukai method are: the deleterious mutation rate, $U$, and the average selection coefficient, $E(a)$, although these must be derived from phenotype observation. $U$, which is specifically the mutation rate for a single copy of a gene is derived from the assumption that deleterious mutations are randomly fixed and from the nature of the diploid organisms, which have two copies of each gene. So the mutation rate from both copies, $2U$, multiplied by the population of the line, $p$, with the assumption of random fixation gives that the deleterious mutation rate,$U = (p2U/p2)$, such that each mutation per line per generation directly counts towards the mutation rate. By tracking the quantitative deleterious change in a trait delta M (ie. number of offspring), the mutation rate can be defined within one line as: $\Delta M = UE(a)$.
