= Manfred Eigen =

German biophysical chemist (1927–2019)

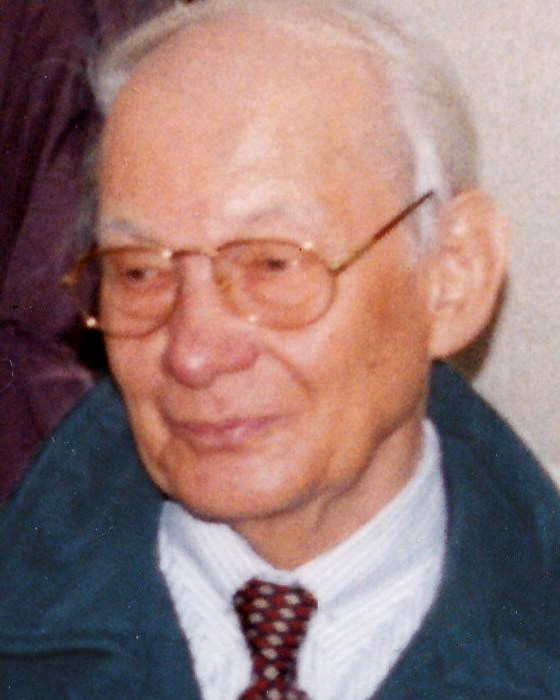
- Manfred Eigen, Göttingen 1996
- Born: 9 May 1927; Bochum, Germany
- Died: 6 February 2019 (aged 91); Göttingen, Germany
- Education: University of Göttingen
- Known for: Error catastrophe; Error threshold; Flash photolysis; Temperature jump method; Hypercycle; Quasispecies model; Diffusion-limited enzyme; T-theory; Eigen cation; Eigen paradox; Eigen–Fuoss equation; Eigen–Wilkins mechanism; Alberty–Hammes–Eigen model
- Awards: Otto Hahn Prize (1962); Nobel Prize in Chemistry (1967)
- Scientific career
- Fields: Biophysical chemistry
- Workplaces: Max Planck Institute for Biophysical Chemistry; Braunschweig University of Technology
- Thesis: Ermittlung der molekularen Struktur reiner Flüssigkeiten und Lösungen aus thermischen und kalorischen Eigenschaften (1951)
- Doctoral advisor: Arnold Eucken
- Doctoral students: Geoffrey Hoffmann
- Website: Official listing at Max Planck Institute for Biophysical Chemistry

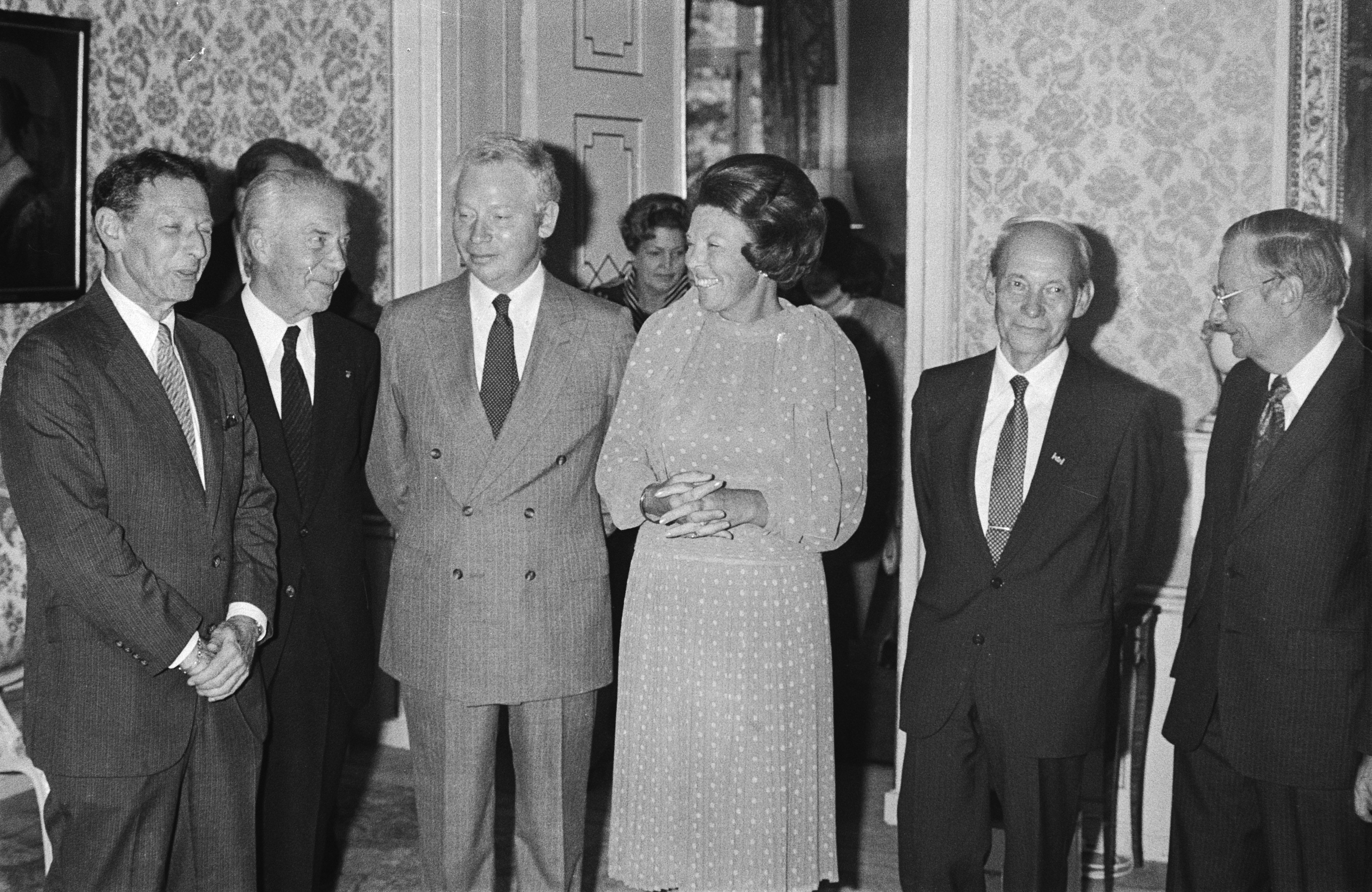
Dutch Queen Beatrix meets five Nobel prize winners (1983): Paul Berg, Christian de Duve, Steven Weinberg, Manfred Eigen & Nicolaas Bloembergen

Manfred Eigen (German pronunciation: [ˈmanˌfʁeːt ˈaɪ̯ɡn̩]; 9 May 1927 – 6 February 2019) was a German biophysical chemist who won the 1967 Nobel Prize in Chemistry for work on measuring fast chemical reactions.

Eigen's research helped solve major problems in physical chemistry and aided in the understanding of chemical processes that occur in living organisms.

In later years, he explored the biochemical roots of life and evolution. He worked to install a multidisciplinary program at the Max Planck Institute to study the underpinnings of life at the molecular level. His work was hailed for creating a new scientific and technological discipline: evolutionary biotechnology.

== Education and early life ==
Eigen was born on 9 May 1927 in Bochum, the son of Ernst Eigen, a chamber musician, and Hedwig née Feld. As a child, he developed a deep passion for music and studied piano.

World War II interrupted his formal education. At age fifteen, he was drafted into service in a German anti-aircraft unit. He was captured by the Americans toward the end of the war. He managed to escape (he said later that escape was relatively easy), and walked hundreds of miles across defeated Germany, arriving in Göttingen in 1945. He lacked the necessary documentation for acceptance to university, but was admitted after he demonstrated his knowledge in an exam. He entered the university's first postwar class.

Eigen desired to study physics, but since returning soldiers who were enrolled previously received priority, he enrolled in Geophysics. He earned an undergraduate degree and began graduate study in natural sciences. One of his advisors was Werner Heisenberg, the noted proponent of the uncertainty principle. He received his doctorate in 1951.

== Career and research ==
Eigen received his Ph.D. at the University of Göttingen in 1951 under the supervision of Arnold Eucken. In 1964, he presented the results of his research at a meeting of the Faraday Society in London. His findings demonstrated for the first time that it was possible to determine the rates of chemical reactions that occurred during time intervals as brief as a nanosecond.

Beginning in 1953, Eigen worked at the Max Planck Institute for Physical Chemistry in Göttingen, becoming its director in 1964 and joining it with the Max Planck Institute for Spectroscopy to become the Max Planck Institute for Biophysical Chemistry. He was an honorary professor of the Braunschweig University of Technology. From 1982 to 1993, Eigen was president of the German National Merit Foundation. Eigen was a member of the Board of Sponsors of The Bulletin of the Atomic Scientists.

In 1967, Eigen was awarded, along with Ronald George Wreyford Norrish and George Porter, the Nobel Prize in Chemistry. They were cited for their studies of extremely fast chemical reactions induced in response to very short pulses of energy.

In addition, Eigen's name is linked with the theory of quasispecies, the error threshold, error catastrophe, Eigen's paradox, and the chemical hypercycle, the cyclic linkage of reaction cycles as an explanation for the self-organization of prebiotic systems, which he described with Peter Schuster in 1977.

Eigen founded two biotechnology companies, Evotec and Direvo.

In 1981, Eigen became a founding member of the World Cultural Council.

Eigen was a member of the Pontifical Academy of Sciences even though he was an atheist. He died on 6 February 2019 at the age of 91.

== Personal life ==
Eigen was married to Elfriede Müller. The union produced two children, a boy and a girl. He later married Ruthild Winkler-Oswatitsch, a longtime scientific partner.

== Honours and awards ==
Eigen won numerous awards for his research, including:

- Otto Hahn Prize (1962)
- Elected a member of the American Academy of Arts and Sciences (1964)
- Elected a member of the United States National Academy of Sciences (1966)
- Nobel Prize in Chemistry (1967), shared with Ronald George Wreyford Norrish and George Porter, for his studies on the kinetics of extremely fast running chemical reactions with relaxation methods
- Elected a member of the American Philosophical Society (1968)
- Member of the Soviet Academy of Sciences (now the Russian Academy of Sciences) (1976)
- Elected a Foreign Member of the Royal Society (ForMemRS) in 1973
- Pour le Mérite (1973)
- Faraday Lectureship Prize from the Royal Society of Chemistry in 1977
- Austrian Decoration for Science and Art
- Lower Saxony State Prize for Science (1980)
- Paul Ehrlich and Ludwig Darmstaedter Prize (1992)
- Helmholtz Medal (Berlin-Brandenburg Academy of Sciences and Humanities, 1994)
- Max Planck Research Award (1994), jointly with Rudolf Rigler of the Karolinska Institute
- Honorary member of the Ruhr University Bochum (2001)
- Lifetime Achievement Award from the Institute of Human Virology in Baltimore (2005)
- Wilhelm Exner Medal (2011)

=== Honorary doctorates ===
He received 15 honorary doctorates.

- Honorary Professor, Technical University of Braunschweig (1965)
- Honorary doctorate from Harvard University (1966)
- Honorary doctorate from Washington University in St. Louis (1966)
- Honorary doctorate from the University of Chicago (1966)
- Honorary doctorate from the University of Nottingham (1968)
- Honorary Professor, University of Göttingen (1971)
- Honorary doctorate from Hebrew University of Jerusalem (1973)
- Honorary doctorate from the University of Hull (1976)
- Honorary doctorate from the University of Bristol (1978)
- Honorary doctorate from the University of Debrecen (1982)
- Honorary doctorate from the University of Cambridge (1982)
- Honorary doctorate from Technical University of Munich (1983)
- Honorary doctorate from Bielefeld University (1985)
- Honorary doctorate from Utah State University (1990)
- Honorary doctorate from the University of Alicante (1990)
- Honorary doctorate from the University of Coimbra, Portugal (2007)
- Honorary Degree, Scripps Institute of Research (2011)

== Bibliography ==
- Eigen, Manfred (2013). From strange simplicity to complex familiarity : a treatise on matter, information, life and thought. Oxford: Oxford University Press. ISBN 978-0-19-857021-9. OCLC 867631103.
- Eigen, Manfred (1971). "Selforganization of matter and the evolution of biological macromolecules". Die Naturwissenschaften. 58 (10). Springer Science and Business Media LLC: 465–523. Bibcode:1971NW.....58..465E. doi:10.1007/bf00623322. ISSN 0028-1042. PMID 4942363. S2CID 38296619.
- Eigen, Manfred (1993). Laws of the game : how the principles of nature govern chance. Princeton, N.J: Princeton University Press. ISBN 0-691-02566-5. OCLC 25787606.
- Manfred Eigen tells his life story at Web of Stories (video)
- Interview with Manfred Eigen by Harry Kroto, NL Freeview video provided by the Vega Science Trust.
- "Falls ein Gott die Naturgesetze erschuf, so erschuf er auch das Leben durch Evolution" (in German) Interview with Manfred Eigen from 2004, Archive
