= Error catastrophe =

Loss of genetic information due to mutation rates

Error catastrophe refers to the cumulative loss of genetic information in a lineage of organisms due to high mutation rates. The mutation rate above which error catastrophe occurs is called the error threshold. Both terms were coined by Manfred Eigen in his mathematical evolutionary theory of the quasispecies.

The term is most widely used to refer to mutation accumulation to the point of inviability of the organism or virus, where it cannot produce enough viable offspring to maintain a population. This use of Eigen's term was adopted by Lawrence Loeb and colleagues to describe the strategy of lethal mutagenesis to cure HIV by using mutagenic ribonucleoside analogs.

There was an earlier use of the term introduced in 1963 by Leslie Orgel in a theory for cellular aging, in which errors in the translation of proteins involved in protein translation would amplify the errors until the cell was inviable. This theory has not received empirical support.

Error catastrophe is predicted in certain mathematical models of evolution and has also been observed empirically.

Like every organism, viruses "make mistakes" (or mutate) during replication. The resulting mutations increase biodiversity among the population and can confer advantages such as helping to subvert the ability of a host's immune system to recognise it in a subsequent infection. The more mutations the virus makes during replication, the more likely it is to avoid recognition by the immune system and the more diverse its population will be (see the article on biodiversity for an explanation of the selective advantages of this). However, mutations are not, as a general rule, beneficial, and if it accumulates too many harmful mutations, it may lose some of its biological features which have evolved to its advantage, including its ability to reproduce at all.

The question arises: how many mutations can occur during each replication before the population of viruses begins to lose the ability to survive?

== Basic mathematical model ==
Consider a virus which has a genetic identity modeled by a string of ones and zeros (e.g. 11010001011101…). Suppose that the string has fixed length L and that during replication the virus copies each digit one by one, making a mistake with probability q independently of all other digits.

Due to the mutations resulting from erroneous replication, there exist up to 2^{L} distinct strains derived from the parent virus. Let x_{i} denote the concentration of strain i; let a_{i} denote the rate at which strain i reproduces; and let Q_{ij} denote the probability of a virus of strain i mutating to strain j.

Then the rate of change of concentration x_{j} is given by

$$\dot{x}_j = \sum_i a_i Q_{ij} x_i$$

At this point, we make a mathematical idealisation: we pick the fittest strain (the one with the greatest reproduction rate a_{j}) and assume that it is unique (i.e. that the chosen a_{j} satisfies a_{j} > a_{i} for all i ≠ j); and we then group the remaining strains into a single group. Let the concentrations of the two groups be x , y with reproduction rates a>b, respectively; let Q be the probability of a virus in the first group (x) mutating to a member of the second group (y) and let R be the probability of a member of the second group returning to the first (via an unlikely and very specific mutation). The equations governing the development of the populations are:

$$\begin{cases}
\dot{x} = & a(1-Q)x + bRy \\
\dot{y} = & aQx + b(1-R)y \\
\end{cases}$$

We are particularly interested in the case where L is very large, so we may safely neglect R and instead consider:

$$\begin{cases}
\dot{x} = & a(1-Q)x \\
\dot{y} = & aQx + by \\
\end{cases}$$

Then setting z = x/y we have

$$\begin{matrix}
\frac{\partial z}{\partial t} & = & \frac{\dot{x} y - x \dot{y}}{y^2} \\
&& \\
& = & \frac{a(1-Q)xy - x (aQx + by)}{y^2} \\
&& \\
& = & a(1-Q)z - (aQz^2 +bz) \\
&& \\
& = & z(a(1-Q) -aQz -b) \\
\end{matrix}$$.

Assuming z achieves a steady concentration over time, z settles down to satisfy

$$z(\infty) = \frac{a(1-Q)-b}{aQ}$$

(which is deduced by setting the derivative of z with respect to time to zero).

So the important question is under what parameter values does the original population persist (continue to exist)? The population persists if and only if the steady state value of z is strictly positive. i.e. if and only if:

$$z(\infty) > 0 \iff a(1-Q)-b >0 \iff (1-Q) > b/a .$$

This result is more popularly expressed in terms of the ratio of a:b and the error rate q of individual digits: set b/a = (1-s), then the condition becomes

$$z(\infty) > 0 \iff (1-Q) = (1-q)^L > 1-s$$

Taking a logarithm on both sides and approximating for small q and s one gets

$$L \ln{(1-q)} \approx -Lq > \ln{(1-s)} \approx -s$$

reducing the condition to:

$$Lq < s$$

RNA viruses which replicate close to the error threshold have a genome size of order 10^{4} (10000) base pairs. Human DNA is about 3.3 billion (10^{9}) base units long. This means that the replication mechanism for human DNA must be orders of magnitude more accurate than for the RNA of RNA viruses.

=== Information-theory based presentation ===
To avoid error catastrophe, the amount of information lost through mutation must be less than the amount gained through natural selection. This fact can be used to arrive at essentially the same equations as the more common differential presentation.

The information lost can be quantified as the genome length L times the replication error rate q. The probability of survival, S, determines the amount of information contributed by natural selection— and information is the negative log of probability. Therefore, a genome can only survive unchanged when

$$Lq < -\log{S}$$

For example, the very simple genome where L = 1 and q = 1 is a genome with one bit which always mutates. Since Lq is then 1, it follows that S has to be 1/2 or less. This corresponds to half the offspring surviving; namely the half with the correct genome.

== Applications ==
Some viruses such as polio or hepatitis C operate very close to the critical mutation rate (i.e. the largest q that L will allow). Drugs have been created to increase the mutation rate of the viruses in order to push them over the critical boundary so that they lose self-identity. However, given the criticism of the basic assumption of the mathematical model, this approach is problematic.

The result introduces a Catch-22 mystery for biologists, Eigen's paradox: in general, large genomes are required for accurate replication (high replication rates are achieved by the help of enzymes), but a large genome requires a high accuracy rate q to persist. The paradox lies in which comes first and how so. An illustration of the difficulty involved is L can only be 100 if q' is 0.99 – a very small string length in terms of genes.

== See also ==
- Error threshold
- Extinction vortex
- Mutational meltdown
