= Outline of evolution =

Overview of and topical guide to change in the heritable characteristics of organisms

The following outline is provided as an overview of and topical guide to evolution:

A diagram showing the relationships among various groups of organisms

In biology, evolution is change in the heritable allele frequencies of biological organisms over generations due to natural selection, mutation, gene flow, and genetic drift. Also known as descent with modification. Over time these evolutionary processes lead to formation of new species (speciation), changes within lineages (anagenesis), and loss of species (extinction). "Evolution" is also another name for evolutionary biology, the subfield of biology concerned with studying evolutionary processes that produced the diversity of life on Earth.

== Fundamentals about evolution ==
Life timeline
← / Earth formed; ← / Earliest water; ← / LUCA; ← / Earliest fossils; ← / Atmospheric oxygen; ← / Sexual reproduction; ← / Earliest fungi; ← / Neoproterozoic oxygenation event; ← / Ediacaran biota; ← / Cambrian explosion; ← / Earliest tetrapods; ← / Earliest hominoid
(million years ago)

=== Introduction ===
- Introduction to evolution – Non-technical overview of the subject of biological evolution
- Evolution – Change in the heritable traits of populations
- Evolution as fact and theory – Discussion of the meaning and usage of the terms evolution, fact and theory

=== Basic principles ===
- Macroevolution – Evolution on a scale at or above the level of species
  - Speciation – Evolutionary process
    - Natural speciation
      - Allopatric speciation – Speciation that occurs between geographically isolated populations
        - Reinforcement (speciation) – Process of increasing reproductive isolation
      - Peripatric speciation – Mode of speciation in evolutionary biology
      - Parapatric speciation – Speciation within a population where subpopulations are reproductively isolated
      - Sympatric speciation – Evolution of a new species from an ancestor in the same location
    - Artificial speciation
      - Animal husbandry – Management of farm animals
      - Plant breeding – Science of changing the traits of plants
      - Genetic engineering – Manipulation of an organism's genome
    - Hybrid speciation – Form of speciation involving hybridization between two different species
  - Despeciation – Loss of a species of animal due to its combining with another species
  - Anagenesis – Gradual evolutionary change in a species without splitting
  - Extinction – Termination of a species' lineage
- Microevolution – Change in allele frequencies that occurs over time within a population
  - Artificial selection – Breeding used to develop desired characteristics
  - Natural selection – Mechanism of evolution by differential reproduction
    - Sexual selection – Mode of natural selection involving the choosing of and competition for mates
  - Mutation – Alteration in the nucleotide sequence of a genome
  - Gene flow – Transfer of genetic variation from one population to another
  - Genetic drift – Concept in genetics

=== Subfields ===
- Biology – Scientific study of life (outline)
  - Evolutionary biology – Study of the evolution of life
    - Evolutionary developmental biology – Comparison of organism developmental processes
  - Genetics – Science of genes, heredity and variation (outline)
- Biogeography – Study of distribution of species
- Ecological genetics – Study of genetics in natural populations
- Evolutionary biology – Study of the evolution of life
  - Evolutionary developmental biology – Comparison of organism developmental processes
- Evolutionary ecology – Interaction of biology and evolution
- Evolutionary physiology – Study of evolutionary changes in physiological characteristics
- Evolutionary taxonomy – Form of biological classification
- Experimental evolution – Use of laboratory and field experiments to explore evolutionary dynamics
- Molecular evolution – Study of changes in DNA and RNA over time
- Phylogenetics – Study of evolutionary relationships between organisms
- Population genetics – Subfield of genetics
- Paleontology – Study of past life through fossils
  - Paleovirology – Study of ancient viruses
  - Timeline of paleontology
- Systematics – Branch of biology

=== History ===
- Charles Darwin – English naturalist and biologist (1809–1882)
  - On the Origin of Species – 1859 book on evolution by Charles Darwin
  - Caricatures of Charles Darwin and his evolutionary theory in 19th-century England
  - Darwinism – Theory of biological evolution
- History of evolutionary thought
  - By period or event
    - Evolutionary ideas of the Scientific Revolution and Enlightenment – Changes in evolutionary philosophies
    - Transmutation of species – 18th and 19th-century evolutionary ideas
    - 1860 Oxford evolution debate – Discussion about evolution in Oxford, England
    - Neo-Darwinism – Used to describe the combination of natural selection and genetics
    - The eclipse of Darwinism – Period when evolution was widely accepted, but natural selection was not
    - Evolutionary progress – Hypothesis that organisms have an innate tendency to evolve towards some goal
    - Scopes Trial – 1925 US legal case in Tennessee
    - Modern synthesis – Fusion of natural selection with Mendelian inheritance
      - Extended evolutionary synthesis – Set of theoretical concepts concerning evolutionary biology
    - Current research – Study of the evolution of life
  - By field
    - Evolutionary developmental biology – Comparison of organism developmental processes
    - History of evolutionary psychology
    - History of molecular evolution – History of the field of study
    - History of paleontology
- Social effect of evolutionary theory – Effects on human societies of the scientific explanation of life's diversity

== Evolutionary theory and modelling ==
See also Basic principles (above)

=== Population genetics ===
- Population genetics – Subfield of genetics
- Process
  - Mutation – Alteration in the nucleotide sequence of a genome
  - Selection – Mechanism of evolution by differential reproduction
    - Natural selection – Mechanism of evolution by differential reproduction
      - Sexual selection – Mode of natural selection involving the choosing of and competition for mates
    - Artificial selection – Breeding used to develop desired characteristics
    - Ecological selection – Mechanism of evolution by differential reproduction
  - Gene flow – Transfer of genetic variation from one population to another
  - Genetic drift – Concept in genetics
    - Small population size – Statistical effects of small numbers on a population
    - Population bottleneck – Sharp reduction in the size of a population
    - Founder effect – Loss of genetic variation in a new population
    - Coalescent theory – Model for tracing the history of genetic variation
- Variation
  - Genetic variation – Difference in DNA among individuals or populations
    - Genetic diversity – Total number of genetic characteristics in a species
    - Gene frequency – The relative frequency of a variant of a gene at a particular locus in a population
    - Polymorphism (biology) – Species having two or more distinct forms
- Key concepts
  - Hardy-Weinberg law – Principle in genetics
  - Genetic linkage – Aspect of population genetics
  - Identity by descent – Concept in genealogy and genetics
  - Linkage disequilibrium – Allele association in population genetics
  - Fisher's fundamental theorem – Principle relating genetic variance to fitness
  - Neutral theory – Theory of evolution by changes at the molecular level
  - Shifting balance theory – One version of the theory of evolution
  - Price equation – Description of how a trait or gene changes in frequency over time
  - Coefficient of relationship – Measure of biological relationship between individuals
  - Fitness – Expected reproductive success
  - Heritability – Estimation of effect of genetic variation on phenotypic variation of a trait
- Effects of selection
  - Genetic hitchhiking – Phenomenon in biology
  - Negative selection (natural selection) – Selective removal of alleles that are deleterious
- Related topics
  - Microevolution – Change in allele frequencies that occurs over time within a population
  - Evolutionary game theory – Application of game theory to evolving populations in biology
  - Fitness landscape – Model used to visualise relationship between genotypes and reproductive success
  - Genetic genealogy – DNA testing to infer relationships
  - Quantitative genetics – Study of the inheritance of continuously variable traits

=== Evolutionary phenomena ===
- Adaptation – Evolutionary process
- Adaptive radiation – Process in which organisms diversify rapidly from an ancestral species
- Behavioral modernity – Transition of human species to anthropologically modern behavior
- Coevolution – Two or more species influencing each other's evolution
- Concerted evolution
- Convergent evolution – Independent evolution of similar features
  - List of examples of convergent evolution – Examples of separate lineages of organisms developing similar characteristics
- Divergent evolution – Accumulation of genetic differences
  - Divergent evolution in animals – Accumulation of genetic differences
- Evolution of ageing – Study of the evolutionary development of ageing processes
- Evolution of biological complexity
- Evolution of multicellularity – Organism that consists of more than one cell
- Evolution of photosynthesis
- Evolution of sexual reproduction
- Evolutionary arms race – Concept in Evolution
- Evolutionary capacitance – Evolutionary biology hypothesis
- Evolutionary fauna
- Evolutionary pressure – Any cause that reduces reproductive success in a proportion of a population
- Evolutionary radiation – Increase in taxonomic diversity or morphological disparity
- Evolutionary trap – Cases in which an evolved, and presumably adaptive, trait has suddenly become maladaptive
- Evolvability – Capacity of a system for adaptive evolution
- Exaptation – Function of trait, shifted by evolution
- Extinction – Termination of a species' lineage
  - Pseudoextinction – Phenomenon where a species is perpetuated by a daughter species
  - Lazarus taxon – Species thought to be extinct that is later rediscovered
  - Extinction risk from climate change – Risk of plant or animal species becoming extinct due to climate change
- Fitness (biology) – Expected reproductive success
  - Inclusive fitness – Measure of evolutionary success
    - Kin selection – Evolutionary strategy favoring relatives
  - Reproductive success – Passing of genes on to the next generation in a way that they too can pass on those genes
- Genetic recombination – Shuffling of genetic material
- Horizontal gene transfer in evolution – Concept in genetics
- Inversion (evolutionary biology) – Hypothesis in developmental biology
- Mosaic evolution – Evolution of characters at various rates both within and between species
- Parallel evolution – Similar evolution in distinct species
- Quantum evolution – Evolution where transitional forms are particularly unstable and do not last long
- Recurrent evolution – Repeated evolution of a particular trait
- Robustness (evolution) – Persistence of a biological trait under uncertain conditions
- Speciation – Evolutionary process

=== Modelling ===
- Emergent evolution – Evolutionary biology
- Epic of evolution – Mythological narrative inspired by evolution
- Evolution window – Narrow band of mutation step size that is conducive to significant evolutionary progress
- Evolutionary dynamics – Modelling evolution using differential equations
- Evolutionary game theory – Application of game theory to evolving populations in biology
- Evolutionary graph theory – Approach to studying how topology affects evolution of a population
- Evolutionary invasion analysis – Mathematical modelling of phenotypic evolution
- Largest-scale trends in evolution – Limits of increased complexity over time

== Taxonomy, systematics, and phylogeny ==
=== Fundamentals ===
- Taxonomy – Science of classifying organisms
  - Alpha taxonomy – The discipline of finding, describing, and naming taxa, particularly species
  - Biological classification – The science of identifying, describing, defining and naming groups of biological organisms
  - Binomial nomenclature – Species naming system
  - Evolutionary taxonomy – Form of biological classification
  - Catalogue of life – Online database and index of taxa
  - Homonym (biology) – Scientific name that is identical in spelling to a name with a different type
  - Integrated Taxonomic Information System – Authoritative taxonomic information on plants, animals, fungi, and microbes
  - International Code of Zoological Nomenclature – Code of scientific nomenclature for animals
  - International Code of Nomenclature for algae, fungi, and plants – Code of scientific nomenclature
  - Linnaean taxonomy – Rank based classification system for organisms
  - Phenetics – Attempt to classify organisms based on overall similarity
  - Species 2000 – Federated taxonomic database system for species checklists
  - Taxon – Unit of biological populations
  - Taxonomic rank – Hierarchical level in biological classification
  - Type (biology) – Specimen(s) chosen to represent a newly described taxon
  - Species description – Formal description of a discovered species
- Systematics – Branch of biology
  - Cladogram – Diagram used to show relations among groups of organisms with common origins
  - Phylogenetic tree – Branching diagram of evolutionary relationships between organisms
- Phylogenetics – Study of evolutionary relationships between organisms
  - Cladistics – Method of biological systematics in evolutionary biology
  - Computational phylogenetics – Application of computational algorithms, methods and programs to phylogenetic analyses
  - Common descent – Characteristic of a group of organisms with a common ancestor
  - Evidence of common descent – Common ancestor evolutionary evidence
  - Evolutionary grade – Grouping of organisms
  - Lineage (evolution) – Sequence of populations, organisms, cells, or genes that form a line of descent
  - Molecular phylogenetics – Branch of phylogeny that analyzes genetic, hereditary molecular differences
  - Most recent common ancestor – Most recent individual from which all organisms in a group are directly descended

=== Basic concepts of phylogenetics ===
- Phylogenetic tree – Branching diagram of evolutionary relationships between organisms
- Phylogenetic network – Graph used to visualize evolutionary relationships, including reticulation events
- Long branch attraction – Systematic error in phylogenetics
- Clade – Group of a common ancestor and all of their descendants
- Grade – Grouping of organisms
- Ghost lineage – Phylogenetic lineage that is inferred to exist but has no fossil record

=== Inference methods ===
- Maximum parsimony (phylogenetics) – Optimality criterion in phylogeny
- Minimum evolution
- Probabilistic methods
  - Maximum likelihood estimation – Method of estimating the parameters of a statistical model, given observations
  - Bayesian inference – Statistical method for molecular phylogenetics
- Distance matrices in phylogeny – Matrices used in construction of phylogenetic trees
  - Neighbor joining – Bottom-up clustering method for creating phylogenetic trees
  - Unweighted Pair Group Method with Arithmetic Mean (UPGMA) – Agglomerative hierarchical clustering method
  - Least squares inference in phylogeny – Method of studying evolutionary history
- Three-taxon analysis – Cladistic based method of phylogenetic reconstruction

=== Current topics ===
- PhyloCode, also known as International Code of Phylogenetic Nomenclature – Proposed code of nomenclature for clades
- DNA barcoding – Method of species identification using a short section of DNA
- Molecular phylogenetics – Branch of phylogeny that analyzes genetic, hereditary molecular differences
- Phylogenetic comparative methods – Methods in evolutionary biology
- Phylogenetic network – Graph used to visualize evolutionary relationships, including reticulation events
- Phylogenetic niche conservatism – Tendency of lineage to retain ancestral traits
- List of phylogenetics software – Compilation of software used to produce phylogenetic trees
- Phylogenomics – Intersection of the fields of evolution and genomics
- Phylogeography – Subfield of genealogy
- DNA phylogeny

=== Group Traits ===
- Symplesiomorphy – An ancestral character or trait state shared by two or more taxa
- Apomorphy – Two concepts on heritable traits
- Synapomorphy – Two concepts on heritable traits
- Autapomorphy – Distinctive feature, known as a derived trait, that is unique to a given taxon

=== Group Types ===
- Monophyly – Taxonomic concept
- Paraphyly – Type of taxonomic group
- Polyphyly – Property of a group not united by common ancestry

== Evolution of biodiversity ==
- Biodiversity – Variety and variability of life forms

=== Origin and evolutionary history of life ===
- Abiogenesis – Life arising from non-living matter
- History of life
- Timeline of the evolutionary history of life

=== Evolution of organisms ===
==== Evolution of tetrapods ====
- Evolution of tetrapods – Evolution of four legged vertebrates and their derivatives
  - Evolution of dinosaurs – Clade of reptiles
    - Evolution of birds – Derivation of birds from a dinosaur precursor
  - Evolution of mammals
    - Evolution of cetaceans
    - Evolution of horses
    - Evolution of primates – Origin and diversification of primates through geologic time
      - Evolution of humans – Evolutionary process leading up to the appearance of anatomically modern humans
        - Evolution of human intelligence – Evolution-related timelines
        - Human evolutionary genetics – Study of differences between human genomes
        - Sexual selection in human evolution – Evolutionary effects of sexual selection on humans
        - Timeline of human evolution
      - Evolution of lemurs – History of primate evolution on Madagascar
    - Evolution of sirenians – Development from a Tethytherian ancestor and radiation of species
  - Evolution of reptiles – Origin and diversification of reptiles through geologic time

==== Evolution of other animals ====
- Evolution of brachiopods
- Evolution of cephalopods – Origin and diversification of cephalopods through geologic time
- Evolution of fish – Origin and diversification of fish through geologic time
- Evolution of insects – Development of insects from an ancestral crustacean and their subsequent radiation
  - Evolution of butterflies – Origin and diversification of butterflies through geologic time
  - Peppered moth evolution – Significance of the peppered moth in evolutionary biology
- Evolution of molluscs
- Evolution of spiders – Origin from a chelicerate ancestor and diversification of spiders through geologic time

==== Evolution of plants ====
- Evolution of plants – The origin and diversification of plants through geologic time
  - Evolutionary anachronism – Attributes of living species that arose due to coevolution with other now-extinct species
  - Plant evolution – Subset of evolutionary phenomena that concern plants
  - Plant evolutionary developmental biology – Study of developmental programs and patterns in plants from an evolutionary perspective
  - Timeline of plant evolution – Chronological outline of major events in the development of plants

==== Evolution of other taxa ====
- Evolution of fungi – Origin and diversification of fungi through geologic time
- Evolution of viruses – Subfield of evolutionary biology and virology concerned with the evolution of viruses
  - Evolution of influenza – Family of RNA viruses including the influenza viruses
- E. coli long-term evolution experiment – Scientific study

=== Evolution of cells, organs, and systems ===
- Evolution of cells – Evolutionary origin and subsequent development of cells
- Evolution of flagella – Origin of three known varieties of flagella
- Evolution of mammalian auditory ossicles – Middle ear bones evolved from jaw bones
- Evolution of nervous systems – Origin and subsequent variation and development of neurons and neural tissues and organs
- Evolution of snake venom – Origin and diversification of snake venom through geologic time
- Evolution of the brain – Overview of animal and human brain evolution
- Evolution of the eye – Origins and diversification of the organs of sight through geologic time
  - Evolution of color vision – Origin and variation of colour vision across various lineages through geologic time
  - Evolution of color vision in primates – Loss and regain of color vision during the evolution of primates
- Immune system – Biological system protecting an organism against disease
- Evolution of metabolism – Set of chemical reactions in organisms

=== Evolution of molecules and genes ===
- Directed evolution – Protein engineering method
- Error threshold (evolution) – Theoretical limit on rate of mutation
- Gene-centered view of evolution – Theory of the "selfish gene"
- Genome evolution – Process by which a genome changes in structure or size over time
- Hologenome theory of evolution – Organism as host plus microbe community
- Models of DNA evolution – Mathematical models of changing DNA
- Molecular evolution – Study of changes in DNA and RNA over time
  - History of molecular evolution – History of the field of study
  - Neutral theory of molecular evolution – Theory of evolution by changes at the molecular level
  - Nearly neutral theory of molecular evolution – Variant of one theory of evolution
- Neutral network (evolution) – Set of genes all related by point mutations that have equivalent function or fitness
- RNA-based evolution – Theory that RNA plays an independent role in determining phenotype

=== Evolution of behaviour ===
- Co-operation (evolution) – Groups of organisms acting for mutual benefit
- Evolution of biparental care in tropical frogs – Change in behaviour in frogs for care of offspring
- Evolution of emotion – Study of the evolution of emotions
- Evolution of empathy – Ability to understand or feel what another is feeling
- Evolution of eusociality – Origins of cooperative brood care
- Monogamy in animals – Natural history of mating systems in which species pair bond to raise offspring
- Reciprocal altruism – Form of behaviour between organisms
- Reciprocity (evolution) – Mechanism favouring cooperative traits

=== Evolution of other processes ===
- Evolution of ageing – Study of the evolutionary development of ageing processes
  - Evolution of aging and mortality – End of an organism's life
  - Origin of programmed cell death – Death of a cell mediated by intracellular program, often as part of development
- Origin of avian flight – Evolution of birds from non-flying ancestors
- Evolution of biological complexity
- Mosaic evolution – Evolution of characters at various rates both within and between species
- Evolution of multicellularity – Organism that consists of more than one cell
- Evolution of sexual reproduction
  - Mating type – Term in biologys
  - Gamete differentiation/sexes – Sexual reproduction involving a large, female gamete and a small, male gamete
  - Sex-determination – Biological system that determines the development of an organism's sex
  - Life cycles/nuclear phases – Series of stages of an organism

== Applications in other disciplines ==
- Applications of evolution – Practical application of biological evolution
- Biological anthropology – Branch of anthropology that studies the physical development of the human species
- Evolutionary aesthetics – Evolutionary psychology theories
- Evolutionary anthropology – Interdisciplinary study
- Evolutionary computation – Trial and error problem solvers with a metaheuristic or stochastic optimization character
  - Evolutionary algorithm – Subset of evolutionary computation
- Evolutionary economics – Subject inspired by evolutionary biology
  - Kenneth Boulding's evolutionary perspective – Approach to economic theory based on an evolutionary model
- Evolutionary epistemology – Ambiguous term applied to several concepts
- Evolutionary ethics – Study of evolution on morality or ethics
- Evolutionary linguistics – Sociobiological approaches to linguistics
- Evolutionary medicine – Application of modern evolutionary theory to understanding health and disease
- Evolutionary neuroscience – Study of the evolution of nervous systems
- Evolutionary psychology – Branch of psychology
  - Biosocial criminology – Psychosocial examination of crime
  - Criticism of evolutionary psychology – Controversy in psychology
  - Evolution of morality – Emergence of human moral behavior over the course of human evolution
  - Evolution of schizophrenia – Theory of natural selection
  - Evolutionary aesthetics – Evolutionary psychology theories
  - Evolutionary approaches to depression
  - Evolutionary developmental psychology – Psychology field concerned with Darwinian evolution
    - Evolutionary developmental psychopathology – Branch of psychology
  - Evolutionary educational psychology – Field of study
  - Evolutionary ethics – Study of evolution on morality or ethics
  - Evolutionary leadership theory – Analysis of leadership from an evolutionary perspective
  - Evolutionary musicology – Subfield of biomusicology
  - Evolutionary origin of religions – Emergence of religious behavior discussed in terms of natural evolution
  - Evolutionary psychology of language – Darwinian adaptation applied to language
  - Evolutionary psychology of parenting – Psychological adaptations in men and women
  - Evolutionary psychology of religion – Study of religious belief using evolutionary psychology principles
  - Theoretical foundations of evolutionary psychology
- Evolutionary robotics – Embodied approach to artificial intelligence
- Evolutionary systems
- Sociobiology – Subdiscipline of biology regarding social behavior
  - Sociocultural evolution – Evolution of societies
  - Cultural evolution – Evolutionary theory of social change
- Universal Darwinism – Application of Darwinian theory to other fields

== Evolutionary issues ==
=== Controversy about evolution ===
- Creation–evolution controversy – Religious rejection of evolution
  - Outline of the creation–evolution controversy – Overview of and topical guide to the creation–evolution controversy
- Criticism of evolutionary psychology – Controversy in psychology
- Evolutionary argument against naturalism – Philosophical argument
- Level of support for evolution – Variation in support for the theory of evolution
- Objections to evolution
- Social effects of evolutionary theory – Effects on human societies of the scientific explanation of life's diversity
- Theology of creationism and evolution – Topic in theology

=== Religious and philosophical views of evolution ===
- Acceptance of evolution by religious groups – General review of religious attitudes towards evolution
- Conscious evolution – Hypothetical ability of the human species to choose what they will become
- Buddhism and evolution – Buddhists' perspectives on the scientific theory of evolution
- Catholic Church and evolution – Attitude of the Catholic Church to evolution theory
- Hindu views on evolution
- Islamic views on evolution
  - Ahmadiyya views on evolution – Ahmadiyya Movement in Islam universally accepts a process of divinely guided evolution
- Jewish views on evolution – Jewish views on biological evolution
- Mormon views on evolution
- Theistic evolution – Scientific view of guided evolution by God

=== Influence of evolutionary theory ===
- Social effects of evolutionary theory – Effects on human societies of the scientific explanation of life's diversity
- See also Applications in other disciplines

== Publications and organizations concerning evolution ==
=== Books ===
- Evolution: The Modern Synthesis – book by Julian Huxley (grandson of Thomas Henry Huxley); one of the most important books of modern evolutionary synthesis, published in 1942
- The Genetical Theory of Natural Selection – book by R.A. Fisher important in modern evolutionary synthesis, first published in 1930
- Genetics and the Origin of Species – 1937 book by Ukrainian-American evolutionary biologist Theodosius Dobzhansky
- On the Origin of Species – seminal book by Charles Darwin concerning evolution by natural selection, first published in 1859
- Systematics and the Origin of Species from the Viewpoint of a Zoologist – book by zoologist and evolutionary biologist Ernst Mayr, canonical publication of modern evolutionary synthesis, first published in 1942 by Columbia University Press
- The Structure of Evolutionary Theory – technical book on macroevolutionary theory by the Harvard paleontologist Stephen Jay Gould
- Evolutionary Biology – 1983 book by Eli C. Minkoff

=== Journals ===
- Evolution – Monthly journal in the science of evolutionary biology
- Evolutionary Anthropology – Bimonthly review journal
- Evolutionary Bioinformatics – American scientific journal
- Evolutionary Psychology – Peer-reviewed open access academic journal
- Journal of Evolutionary Biology – Bimonthly peer-reviewed scientific journal
- Journal of Zoological Systematics and Evolutionary Research – Quarterly, peer reviewed, scientific journal
- Trends in Ecology & Evolution (TREE) – Series of review journals

=== Organizations ===
- European Society for Evolutionary Biology – Organisation to support the study of organic evolution
- Society for the Study of Evolution – Professional organization of evolutionary biologists
- Evolutionary psychology research groups and centers
- I. M. Sechenov Institute of Evolutionary Physiology and Biochemistry – Research facility in Saint Petersburg, Russia
- Max Planck Institute for Evolutionary Anthropology – Research institute based in Leipzig, Germany
- Max Planck Institute for Evolutionary Biology – Research institute located in Plön, Schleswig-Holstein, Germany
- National Evolutionary Synthesis Center – Scientific research center in Durham, North Carolina
- Systematic and Evolutionary Biogeography Association
- Evolutionary Informatics Lab – American engineer and intelligent design advocate (born 1950)

== Evolution scholars and researchers ==
- List of evolutionary psychologists
- List of members of the National Academy of Sciences (Evolutionary biology)

=== Prominent evolutionary biologists ===
- Charles Darwin – English naturalist and biologist (1809–1882)
- Theodosius Dobzhansky – Russian-American geneticist and evolutionary biologist (1900–1975)
- Richard Dawkins – British evolutionary biologist and author (born 1941)
- Stephen Jay Gould – American biologist and historian of science (1941–2002)
- J. B. S. Haldane – Geneticist and evolutionary biologist (1892–1964)
- Julian Huxley – English biologist and philosopher (1887–1975)
- Thomas Henry Huxley – English biologist (1825–1895)
- Ronald Fisher – British polymath (1890–1962)
- Ernst Mayr – German-American evolutionary biologist (1904–2005)
- Alfred Russel Wallace – English naturalist (1823–1913)
- Sewall Wright – American geneticist (1889–1988)

== See also ==
- Outline of biology
  - Outline of genetics – Hierarchical outline list of articles related to genetics
- Biogeography – Study of distribution of species
- Conscious evolution – Hypothetical ability of the human species to choose what they will become
- Ecology and Evolutionary Biology – Interdisciplinary field of study
- Effective evolutionary time – Hypothesis offering a causal explanation of diversity gradients
- Evolutionary acquisition of neural topologies – Method that evolves both the topology and weights of artificial neural networks
- Evolutionary anachronism – Attributes of living species that arose due to coevolution with other now-extinct species
- Evolutionary approaches to depression
- Evolutionary argument against naturalism – Philosophical argument
- Evolutionary art – Art generated by an iterated process
  - Evolutionary music – Audio counterpart to evolutionary art
- Evolutionary baggage – Currently disadvantageous part of the genome
- Evolutionary Humanism – Life stance that embraces human reason, secular ethics, and philosophical naturalism
- Evolutionary informatics – Pseudoscientific argument for the existence of God
- Evolutionary landscape – Metaphor used to visualize the processes of evolution
- Evolutionary Principle
- Extinction – Termination of a species' lineage
  - Extinction event – Rapid decrease in Earth's biodiversity
  - Human extinction – End of the human species
  - Local extinction – Disappearance of a species from a specific area
- MEGA, Molecular Evolutionary Genetics Analysis – Software for statistical analysis of molecular evolution
- Sloshing bucket model of evolution – Theory in evolutionary biology
- Spandrel (biology) – Evolutionary byproduct of some other characteristic
- Speculative evolution – Science fiction genre
- Transitional fossil – Type of fossilized remains
