= Index of evolutionary biology articles =

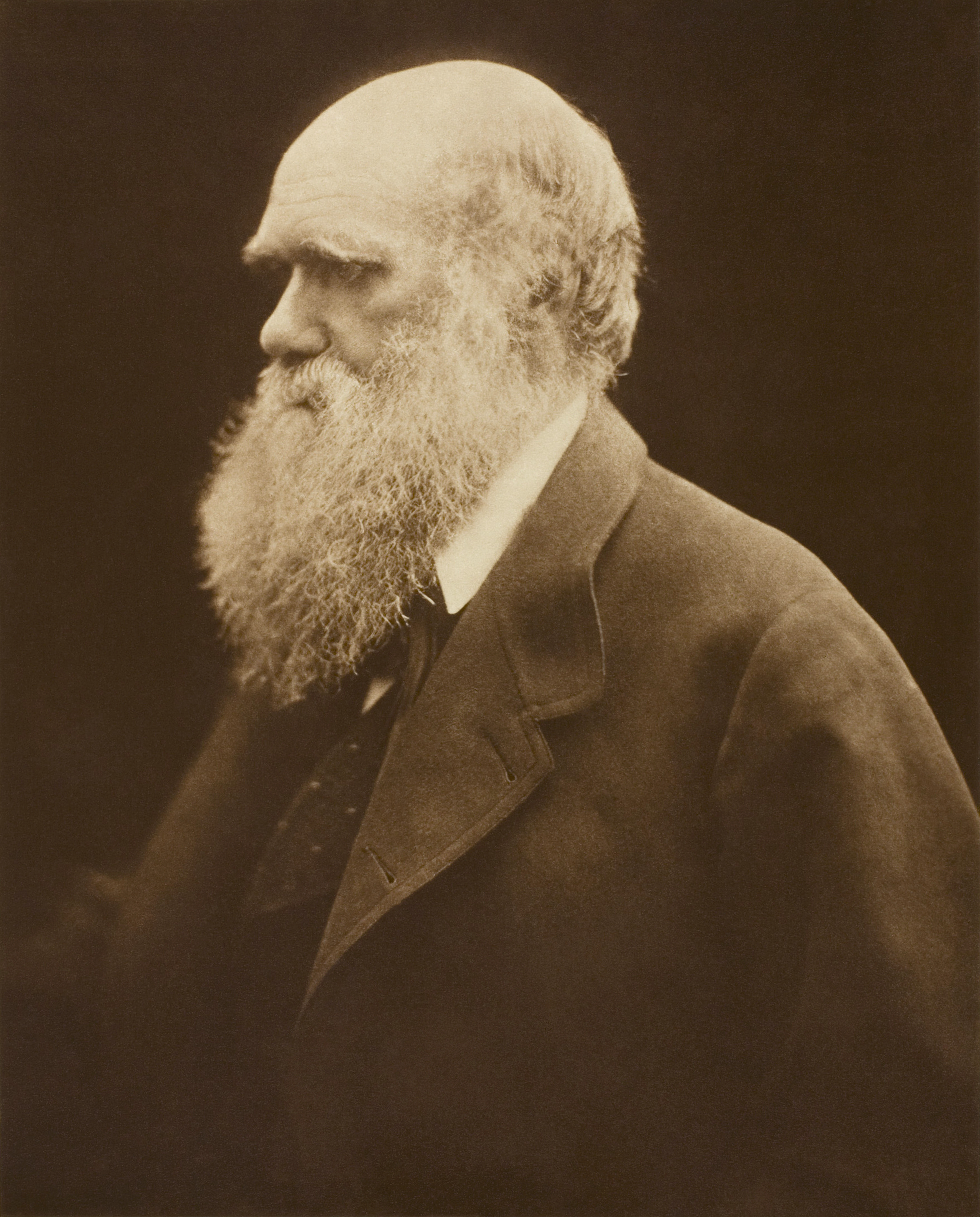
Charles Darwin founded modern evolutionary biology with his 1859 book, The Origin of Species.

This is a list of topics in evolutionary biology.

== A ==
abiogenesis – adaptation – adaptive mutation – adaptive radiation – allele – allele frequency – allochronic speciation – allopatric speciation – altruism – anagenesis – anti-predator adaptation – applications of evolution – apomorphy – aposematism – Archaeopteryx – aquatic adaptation – artificial selection – atavism

== B ==
Henry Walter Bates – biological organisation – Black Queen hypothesis – Brassica oleracea – breed

== C ==
Cambrian explosion – camouflage – Sean B. Carroll – catagenesis – gene-centered view of evolution – cephalization – Sergei Chetverikov – chronobiology – chronospecies – clade – cladistics – climatic adaptation – coalescent theory – co-evolution – co-operation – coefficient of relationship – common descent – convergent evolution – creation–evolution controversy – cultivar – conspecific song preference

== D ==
Darwin (unit) – Charles Darwin – Darwinism – Darwin's finches – Richard Dawkins – directed mutagenesis – Directed evolution – directional selection – disruptive selection – Theodosius Dobzhansky – dog breeding – domestication – domestication of the horse

== E ==
E. coli long-term evolution experiment – ecological genetics – ecological selection – ecological speciation – Endless Forms Most Beautiful – endosymbiosis – error threshold (evolution) – evidence of common descent – evolution – evolutionary arms race – evolutionary capacitance

Evolution: of ageing – of the brain – of cetaceans – of complexity – of dinosaurs – of the eye – of fish – of the horse – of insects – of human intelligence – of mammalian auditory ossicles – of mammals – of monogamy – of sex – of sirenians – of tetrapods – of the wolf

evolutionary developmental biology – evolutionary dynamics – evolutionary game theory – evolutionary history of life – evolutionary history of plants – evolutionary invasion analysis - evolutionary medicine – evolutionary neuroscience – evolutionary psychology – evolutionary radiation – evolutionarily stable strategy – evolutionary taxonomy – evolutionary tree – evolvability – experimental evolution – exaptation – extinction

== F ==
Joe Felsenstein – R.A. Fisher – Fisher's reproductive value – fitness – fitness landscape – fixation index (FST) – fluctuating selection – E.B. Ford – fossil – frequency-dependent selection

== G ==
Galápagos Islands – gene – gene-centric view of evolution – gene duplication – gene flow – gene pool – genetic drift – genetic hitchhiking – genetic recombination – genetic variation – genotype – gene–environment correlation – gene–environment interaction – genotype–phenotype distinction – Stephen Jay Gould – gradualism – Peter and Rosemary Grant – group selection

== H ==
J. B. S. Haldane – W. D. Hamilton – Hardy–Weinberg principle – heredity – hierarchy of life – history of evolutionary thought – history of speciation – homologous chromosomes – homology (biology) – horizontal gene transfer – human evolution – human evolutionary genetics – human vestigiality – Julian Huxley – Thomas Henry Huxley

== I ==
inclusive fitness – insect evolution – Invertebrate paleontology (a.k.a. invertebrate paleobiology or paleozoology)

== K ==
karyotype – kin selection – Motoo Kimura – koinophilia

== L ==
Jean-Baptiste Lamarck – Lamarckism – landrace – language – last universal common ancestor – level of support for evolution – Richard Lewontin – list of gene families – list of human evolution fossils – life-history theory – Wen-Hsiung Li – living fossils – Charles Lyell

== M ==
macroevolution – macromutation – The Major Transitions in Evolution – maladaptation – The Malay Archipelago – mass extinctions – mating systems – John Maynard Smith – Ernst Mayr – Gregor Mendel – memetics – Mendelian inheritance – Mesozoic–Cenozoic radiation – microevolution – micropaleontology (a.k.a. micropaleobiology) – Miller–Urey experiment – mimicry – Mitochondrial Eve – modern evolutionary synthesis – molecular clock – molecular evolution – molecular phylogeny – molecular systematics – mosaic evolution – most recent common ancestor – Hermann Joseph Muller – Muller's ratchet – mutation – mutational meltdown

== N ==
natural selection – natural genetic engineering – nature versus nurture – negative selection – Neo-Darwinism – neutral theory of molecular evolution – Baron Franz Nopcsa – "Nothing in Biology Makes Sense Except in the Light of Evolution"

== O ==
Susumu Ohno – Aleksandr Oparin – On The Origin of Species – Ordovician radiation – origin of birds – origin of language – orthologous genes (orthologs)

== P ==
paleoanthropology – paleobiology – paleobotany – paleontology – paleozoology (of vertebrates – of invertebrates) – parallel evolution – paralogous genes (paralogs) – parapatric speciation – paraphyletic – particulate inheritance – peppered moth – peppered moth evolution – peripatric speciation – phenotype – phylogenetics – phylogeny – phylogenetic tree – Pikaia – Plant evolution – polymorphism (biology) – population – population bottleneck – population dynamics – population genetics – preadaptation – prehistoric archaeology – Principles of Geology – George R. Price – Price equation – punctuated equilibrium

== Q ==
quantitative genetics - quantum evolution – quasispecies model

== R ==
race (taxonomy) – Red Queen hypothesis – recapitulation theory – recent African origin of modern humans – recombination – Bernhard Rensch – reinforcement (speciation) – reproductive coevolution in Ficus – reproductive isolation – r/K selection theory

== S ==
selection – selective breeding – selfish DNA – The Selfish Gene – sexual selection – signalling theory – sociobiology – social effects of evolutionary theory – species – speciation – species flock – sperm competition – stabilizing selection – strain (biology) – subspecies – survival of the fittest – symbiogenesis – sympatric speciation – synapomorphy – systematics – George Gaylord Simpson – G. Ledyard Stebbins

== T ==
Tiktaalik – timeline of evolution – trait (biological) – transgressive phenotype – transitional fossil – transposon – tree of life – triangle of U

== U ==
unit of selection

== V ==
variety (botany) – vertebrate paleontology (a.k.a. vertebrate paleobiology or paleozoology) – viral evolution – The Voyage of the Beagle – vestigiality

== W ==
Alfred Russel Wallace – Wallace effect – Wallace Line – Wallacea – George C. Williams (biologist) – Edward O. Wilson – Sewall Wright

== Y ==
Y-chromosomal Adam – Y-DNA haplogroups by ethnic groups

== See also ==
- List of biology topics
- List of biochemistry topics
