= Catagenesis =

Catagenesis may refer to:

- Catagenesis (geology), the cracking process in which organic kerogens are broken down into hydrocarbons
- Catagenesis (biology), archaic term from evolutionary biology meaning retrogressive evolution, as contrasted with anagenesis
