= Theoretical foundations of evolutionary psychology =

The theoretical foundations of evolutionary psychology are the general and specific scientific theories that explain the ultimate origins of psychological traits in terms of evolution. These theories originated with Charles Darwin's work, including his speculations about the evolutionary origins of social instincts in humans. Modern evolutionary psychology, however, is possible only because of advances in evolutionary theory in the 20th century.

Evolutionary psychologists say that natural selection has provided humans with many psychological adaptations, in much the same way that it generated humans' anatomical and physiological adaptations. As with adaptations in general, psychological adaptations are said to be specialized for the environment in which an organism evolved, the environment of evolutionary adaptedness, or EEA. Sexual selection provides organisms with adaptations related to mating. For male mammals, which have a relatively fast reproduction rate, sexual selection leads to adaptations that help them compete for females. For female mammals, with a relatively slow reproduction rate, sexual selection leads to choosiness, which helps females select higher quality mates. Charles Darwin described both natural selection and sexual selection, but he relied on group selection to explain the evolution of self-sacrificing behavior. Group selection is a weak explanation because in any group the less self-sacrificing animals will be more likely to survive and the group will become less self-sacrificing.

In 1964, William D. Hamilton proposed inclusive fitness theory, emphasizing a "gene's-eye" view of evolution. Hamilton noted that individuals can increase the replication of their genes into the next generation by helping close relatives with whom they share genes survive and reproduce. According to "Hamilton's rule", a self-sacrificing behavior can evolve if it helps close relatives so much that it more than compensates for the individual animal's sacrifice. Inclusive fitness theory resolved the issue of how "altruism" evolved. Other theories also help explain the evolution of altruistic behavior, including evolutionary game theory, tit-for-tat reciprocity, and generalized reciprocity. These theories not only help explain the development of altruistic behavior but also account for hostility toward cheaters (individuals that take advantage of others' altruism).

Several mid-level evolutionary theories inform evolutionary psychology. The R/K selection theory proposes that some species prosper by having many offspring while others follow the strategy of having fewer offspring but investing much more in each one. Humans follow the second strategy. Parental investment theory explains how parents invest more or less in individual offspring based on how successful those offspring are likely to be, and thus how much they might improve the parents' inclusive fitness. According to the Trivers–Willard hypothesis, parents in good conditions tend to invest more in sons (who are best able to take advantage of good conditions), while parents in poor conditions tend to invest more in daughters (who are best able to have successful offspring even in poor conditions). According to life history theory, animals evolve life histories to match their environments, determining details such as age at first reproduction and number of offspring. Dual inheritance theory posits that genes and human culture have interacted, with genes affecting the development of culture and culture, in turn, affecting human evolution on a genetic level (see also the Baldwin effect).

Critics of evolutionary psychology have sometimes challenged its theoretical underpinnings, saying that humans never developed powerful social instincts through natural selection and that the hypotheses of evolutionary psychologists are merely just-so-stories.

== General evolutionary theory ==
Evolutionary psychology primarily uses the theories of natural selection, sexual selection, and inclusive fitness to explain the evolution of psychological adaptations.

Evolutionary psychology is sometimes seen not simply as a subdiscipline of psychology but as a metatheoretical framework in which the entire field of psychology can be examined.

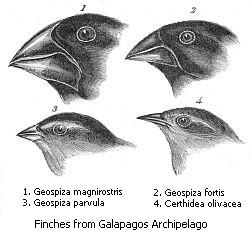
Darwin's illustrations of beak variation in the finches of the Galápagos Islands.

=== Natural selection ===
Evolutionary psychologists consider Charles Darwin's theory of natural selection to be important to an understanding of psychology. Natural selection occurs because individual organisms who are genetically better suited to the current environment leave more descendants, and their genes spread through the population, thus explaining why organisms fit their environments so closely. This process is slow and cumulative, with new traits layered over older traits. The advantages created by natural selection are known as adaptations. Evolutionary psychologists say that animals, just as they evolve physical adaptations, evolve psychological adaptations.

Evolutionary psychologists emphasize that natural selection mostly generates specialized adaptations, which are more efficient than general adaptations. They point out that natural selection operates slowly, and that adaptations are sometimes out of date when the environment changes rapidly. In the case of humans, evolutionary psychologists say that much of human nature was shaped during the stone age and may not match the contemporary environment.

=== Sexual selection ===
Sexual selection favors traits that provide mating advantages, such as the peacock's tail, even if these same traits are usually hindrances. Evolutionary psychologists point out that, unlike natural selection, sexual selection typically leads to the evolution of sex differences. Sex differences typically make reproduction faster for one sex and slower for the other, in which case mates are relatively scarce for the faster sex. Sexual selection favors traits that increase the number of mates for the fast sex and the quality of mates for the slow sex. For mammals, the female has the slower reproduction rate. Males typically evolve either traits to help them fight other males or traits to impress females. Females typically evolve greater abilities to discern the qualities of males, such as choosiness in mating.

=== Inclusive fitness ===
Inclusive fitness theory, proposed by William D. Hamilton, emphasized a "gene's-eye" view of evolution. Hamilton noted that what evolution ultimately selects are genes, not groups or species. From this perspective, individuals can increase the replication of their genes into the next generation not only directly via reproduction, by also indirectly helping close relatives with whom they share genes survive and reproduce. General evolutionary theory, in its modern form, is essentially inclusive fitness theory.

Inclusive fitness theory resolved the issue of how "altruism" evolved. The dominant, pre-Hamiltonian view was that altruism evolved via group selection: the notion that altruism evolved for the benefit of the group. The problem with this was that if one organism in a group incurred any fitness costs on itself for the benefit of others in the group, (i.e. acted "altruistically"), then that organism would reduce its own ability to survive and/or reproduce, therefore reducing its chances of passing on its altruistic traits.

Furthermore, the organism that benefited from that altruistic act and only acted on behalf of its own fitness would increase its own chance of survival and/or reproduction, thus increasing its chances of passing on its "selfish" traits. Inclusive fitness resolved "the problem of altruism" by demonstrating that altruism can evolve via kin selection as expressed in Hamilton's rule:

cost < relatedness × benefit

In other words, altruism can evolve as long as the fitness cost of the altruistic act on the part of the actor is less than the degree of genetic relatedness of the recipient times the fitness benefit to that recipient. This perspective reflects what is referred to as the gene-centered view of evolution and demonstrates that group selection is a very weak selective force.

=== Theoretical foundations ===
Central Concepts
| System level | Problem | Author | Basic ideas | Example adaptations |
|---|---|---|---|---|
| Individual | How to survive? | Charles Darwin (1859), (1872) | Natural selection (or "survival selection") The bodies and minds of organisms are made up of evolved adaptations designed to help the organism survive in a particular ecology (for example, the fur of polar bears, the eye, food preferences, etc.). | Bones, skin, vision, pain perception, etc. |
| Dyad | How to attract a mate and/or compete with members of one's own sex for access to the opposite sex? | Charles Darwin (1871) | Sexual selection Organisms can evolve physical and mental traits designed specifically to attract mates (e.g., the Peacock's tail) or to compete with members of one's own sex for access to the opposite sex (e.g., antlers). | Peacock's tail, antlers, courtship behavior, etc. |
| Family & Kin | Indirect gene replication via kin. How to help those with whom we share genes survive and reproduce? | W.D. Hamilton (1964) | Inclusive fitness (or "gene's eye view", "kin selection") / Evolution of sexual reproduction Selection occurs most robustly at the level of the gene, not the individual, group, or species. Reproductive success can thus be indirect, via shared genes in kin. Being altruistic toward kin can thus have genetic payoffs. (Also see Gene-centered view of evolution) Also, Hamilton argued that sexual reproduction evolved primarily as a defense against pathogens (bacteria and viruses) to "shuffle genes" to create greater diversity, especially immunological variability, in offspring. | Altruism toward kin, parental investment, the behavior of the social insects with sterile workers (e.g., ants). |
| Kin and Family | How are resources best allocated in mating and/or parenting contexts to maximize inclusive fitness? | Robert Trivers (1972) | Parental investment theory / Parent–Offspring conflict / Reproductive value The two sexes often have conflicting strategies regarding how much to invest in offspring, and how many offspring to have. Parents allocate more resources to their offspring with higher reproductive value (e.g., "mom always liked you best"). Parents and offspring may have conflicting interests (e.g., when to wean, allocation of resources among offspring, etc.) | Sexually dimorphic adaptations that result in a "battle of the sexes," parental favoritism, timing of reproduction, parent-offspring conflict, sibling rivalry, etc. |
| Non-kin small group | How to succeed in competitive interactions with non-kin? How to select the best strategy given the strategies being used by competitors? | Neumann & Morgenstern (1944); John Smith (1982) | Game theory / Evolutionary game theory Organisms adapt, or respond, to competitors depending on the strategies used by competitors. Strategies are evaluated by the probable payoffs of alternatives. In a population, this typically results in an "evolutionary stable strategy," or "evolutionary stable equilibrium"—strategies that, on average, cannot be bettered by alternative strategies. | Facultative, or frequency-dependent, adaptations. Examples: hawks vs. doves, cooperate vs. defect, fast vs. coy courtship, etc. |
| Non-kin small group | How to maintain mutually beneficial relationships with non-kin in repeated interactions? | Robert Trivers (1971) | "Tit for tat" reciprocity A specific game strategy (see above) that has been shown to be optimal in achieving an evolutionary stable equilibrium in situations of repeated social interactions. One plays nice with non-kin if a mutually beneficially reciprocal relationship is maintained across multiple interactions, while cheating is punished. | Cheater detection, emotions of revenge and guilt, etc. |
| Non-kin, large groups governed by rules and laws | How to maintain mutually beneficial relationships with strangers with whom one may interact only once? | Herbert Gintis (2000, 2003) and others | Generalized Reciprocity (Also called "strong reciprocity"). One can play nice with non-kin strangers even in single interactions if social rules against cheating are maintained by neutral third parties (e.g., other individuals, governments, institutions, etc.), a majority group members cooperate by generally adhering to social rules, and social interactions create a positive sum game (i.e., a bigger overall "pie" results from group cooperation). Generalized reciprocity may be a set of adaptations that were designed for small in-group cohesion during times of high intertribal warfare with out-groups. Today the capacity to be altruistic to in-group strangers may result from a serendipitous generalization (or "mismatch") between ancestral tribal living in small groups and today's large societies that entail many single interactions with strangers. (The dark side of generalized reciprocity may be that these adaptations may also underlie aggression toward out-groups.) | To in-group members: Capacity for generalized altruism, acting like a "good Samaritan," cognitive concepts of justice, ethics and human rights. To out-group members: Capacity for xenophobia, racism, warfare, genocide. |
| Large groups / culture. | How to transfer information across distance and time? | Richard Dawkins (1976), Susan Blackmore (2000), Boyd & Richerson (2004) | Memetic selection / Memetics / Dual inheritance theory Genes are not the only replicators subject to evolutionary change. Cultural characteristics, also referred to as "Memes" (e.g., ideas, rituals, tunes, cultural fads, etc.) can replicate and spread from brain to brain, and many of the same evolutionary principles that apply to genes apply to memes as well. Genes and memes may at times co-evolve ("gene-culture co-evolution"). | Language, music, evoked culture, etc. Some possible by-products, or "exaptations," of language may include writing, reading, mathematics, etc. |

== Middle-level evolutionary theories ==
Middle-level evolutionary theories are consistent with general evolutionary theory, but focus on certain domains of functioning (Buss, 2011) Specific evolutionary psychology hypotheses may be derivative from a mid-level theory (Buss, 2011). Three very important middle-level evolutionary theories were contributed by Robert Trivers as well as Robert MacArthur and E. O. Wilson

- The theory of parent–offspring conflict rests on the fact that even though a parent and his/her offspring are 50% genetically related, they are also 50% genetically different. All things being equal, a parent would want to allocate their resources equally amongst their offspring, while each offspring may want a little more for themselves. Furthermore, an offspring may want a little more resources from the parent than the parent is willing to give. In essence, parent-offspring conflict refers to a conflict of adaptive interests between parent and offspring. However, if all things are not equal, a parent may engage in discriminative investment towards one sex or the other, depending on the parent's condition.
- The Trivers–Willard hypothesis, which proposes that parents will invest more in the sex that gives them the greatest reproductive payoff (grandchildren) with increasing or marginal investment. Females are the heavier parental investors in our species. Because of that, females have a better chance of reproducing at least once in comparison to males, but males in good condition have a better chance of producing high numbers of offspring than do females in good condition. Thus, according to the Trivers–Willard hypothesis, parents in good condition are predicted to favor investment in sons, and parents in poor condition are predicted to favor investment in daughters.
- R/K selection theory, which, in ecology, relates to the selection of traits in organisms that allow success in particular environments. r-selected species, i.e., species in unstable or unpredictable environments, produce many offspring, each of which is unlikely to survive to adulthood. By contrast, K-selected species, i.e., species in stable or predictable environments, invest more heavily in fewer offspring, each of which has a better chance of surviving to adulthood.
- Life history theory posits that the schedule and duration of key events in an organism's lifetime are shaped by natural selection to produce the largest possible number of surviving offspring. For any given individual, available resources in any particular environment are finite. Time, effort, and energy used for one purpose diminishes the time, effort, and energy available for another. Examples of some major life history characteristics include: age at first reproductive event, reproductive lifespan and aging, and number and size of offspring. Variations in these characteristics reflect different allocations of an individual's resources (i.e., time, effort, and energy expenditure) to competing life functions. For example, attachment theory proposes that caregiver attentiveness in early childhood can determine later adult attachment style. Also, Jay Belsky and others have found evidence that if the father is absent from the home, girls reach first menstruation earlier and also have more short term sexual relationships as women.
