= Evolution of biparental care in tropical frogs =

Change in behaviour in frogs for care of offspring

The evolution of biparental care in tropical frogs is the evolution of the behaviour of a parental care system in frogs in which both the mother and father raise their offspring.

== Evolution ==
Many tropical frogs have developed a parental care system where both the mother and father partake in raising their offspring. The evolution of biparental care, which is the joint effort of both parents, is a topic that is still under investigation. Biparentalism arose in some species of tropical frogs as a result of ecological conditions, the differences between the sexes, and their natural tendencies.

Male parental care could have served as the basis for the development of biparental care. Phylogenetic evidence shows that male parental care is the ancestral strategy in Dendrobates. Currently there are Dendrobates species, such as D. ventrimaculatus and D. fantasticus, that exhibit biparental care. The trend of using males to guard or brood eggs for biparental care or paternal care can be understood from the perspective of the female. After oviposition, or when the eggs are laid, the females need to replenish their bodies that have been dedicated to nurturing the eggs before they can mate again. Brooding by the females would delay the opportunity to mate by about two to four weeks. Since this outcome would cause many males to compete for a few females that are able to mate, the males are favored for the brooding.

== Environment ==
The environment can have a substantial impact on the uses of parental care. Not all tropical frogs have the ability to lay their eggs plainly on land or plants. Tropical frogs can choose from a variety of water sources, such as lakes, streams, and small puddles. There is greater risk involved with reproducing in bigger bodies of water because of the higher likelihood of fish and other aquatic predators being there. Instead, frogs can choose to place eggs in phytotelmata. However, there is a trade-off that comes with electing a smaller water source. Not much sunlight reaches these locations, so algae and other food sources cannot grow to feed the inhabitants. Tropical frogs must use alternative methods of feeding their tadpole offspring. In the case of using phytotelmata, it is very difficult for one parent to guard and feed his or her offspring in possibly several different places. Roles performed by both parents provide a great advantage to the offspring. As seen in the Amazon rainforest, the different size of the bodies of water chosen for breeding correlates with the amount of biparental care in two very similar species of the genus Ranitomeya. Ranitomeya imitator favors smaller pools and uses biparental care. Conversely, Ranitomeya variabilis utilizes larger bodies of water for breeding and only males take part in parental care. The ecologic aspects of a species habitat can have significant impacts on the type of parental care exhibited.

== Competition ==
Trophic egg feeding plays a key role in the ability of frogs to breed in smaller bodies of water that lack food sources. Many species of tropical frogs have an inherent nature of cannibalism, such as Dendrobates vanzolinii, that allow their tadpoles to utilize the eggs for nourishment. With a male guarding the eggs, an intermediate step to developing biparental care may have been using the eggs from a mating with another female to feed existing tadpoles. Males could direct where the eggs should be positioned, and then he could move them into the water that holds his tadpole offspring. This polygynous relationship puts a cost on the female because she loses eggs to benefit offspring that are not her own. It is possible that the female could counter this effect by participating in biparental care with her mate. Also, since there may be a lack of males, females could benefit from attacking other clutches that her mate might have fertilized. Eliminating competition of a female's offspring might result in higher survival of those she is trying to protect. Females have been seen eating other females' eggs in captivity by certain species, such as Dendrobates auratus. This intrasexual competition among the females might have been another important driving force for bringing about biparental care. Multiple factors contributed to the evolution of biparental care in some species of tropical frogs.
