= Evolutionary baggage =

Currently disadvantageous part of the genome

Evolutionary baggage is the part of the genome of a population that was advantageous in past individuals but is disadvantageous under the pressures exerted by natural selection today.

== Origin ==
Genes that may have been advantageous in the past may be critically unfit for individuals in today's environment. Natural selection is not a perfect process; if an organism is “fit enough” to survive a particular environment and reproduce, its genes are passed on to the next generation. Some of these genes may increase an organism's fitness while some may even be slightly disadvantageous. This seeming paradox is the origin of evolutionary baggage, which is the collectively inherited traits that evolved in a different environment from the present.

== Sickle-cell and malaria ==
As a recessive gene, Sickle-cell disease is only present if homozygous, with no dominant gene to beat them out. Sickle-cell disease, originating in people living in tropical areas where malaria is prevalent, is a hereditary blood disorder characterized by rigid, sickle-shaped red blood cells. The unusual shape and rigidity of these altered red blood cells reduces a cell's ability to effectively travel with regular blood flow, occasionally blocking veins and preventing proper blood flow. Life expectancy is shortened for people with sickle-cell disease, though modern medicine has significantly lengthened the life expectancy of someone with this disease. As detrimental the effects of sickle-cell disease seem, it also offers an unforeseen benefit; humans with the sickle-cell gene show less severe symptoms when infected with malaria, as the abnormal shape of blood cells caused by the disease hinder the malaria parasite's ability to invade and replicate within these cells. It is possible to have the sickle-cell allele, but not have the disease, for example if heterozygous.

Malaria, a mosquito-borne infectious disease of humans and other animals, is a potentially deadly disease that causes fever, fatigue, nausea, muscular pain, coughing, and, in extreme cases, coma and death. Malaria is caused by parasitic protozoans transferred through mosquito saliva into a person's circulatory system, where they travel to the liver to mature. There were an estimated 219 million documented cases of malaria in 2010 according to the World Health Organization.

The correlation between sickle-cell disease and malaria is a double-edged sword. Having a sickle-cell allele does limit the life expectancy of a person, however, the presence of sickle-cell genes reduces the detrimental effects of malaria should it be contracted. Natural selection allowed for the spreading of the sickle-cell gene in areas of high numbers of mosquitoes carrying malaria; those that weren't as susceptible to malaria were much more likely to live than those that were. Because malaria is not as prevalent as it once was, the benefits of sickle-cell have since eroded, leaving behind the detrimental effects of the disease.

== See also ==
- Vestigiality
- Pseudogene
