= Evolution window =

Narrow band of mutation step size that is conducive to significant evolutionary progress

Evolution window is the narrow band of the mutation step size σ, where significant progress toward the fitness/objective function's optimum was observed in evolution strategies.

There are three well-known methods to adapt the mutation step size σ in evolution strategies:

- (1/5-th) Success Rule
- Self-Adaptation (for example through log-normal mutations)
- Cumulative Step Size Adaptation (CSA)

On simple functions all of them have been empirically shown to keep the step size within the evolution window.

== See also ==
- Bionics
- Cybernetics
- Evolutionary Algorithm
- Optimization (mathematics)
