= Theology of creationism and evolution =

Topic in theology

The theology of creation and evolution is theology that deals with issues concerning the universe, the life, and especially man, in terms of creation or evolution.

== Creationism ==
Creationism is the religious belief that the universe and life originated "from specific acts of divine creation", as opposed to the scientific conclusion that they came about through natural processes such as evolution.

Churches address the theological implications raised by creationism and evolution in different ways.

== Evolution ==
Most contemporary Christian leaders and scholars from many mainstream churches, such as Roman Catholic, Anglican and some Lutheran denominations, reject reading the Bible as though it could shed light on the physics of creation instead of the spiritual meaning of creation. According to the Archbishop of Canterbury, Rowan Williams, "[for] most of the history of Christianity there's been an awareness that a belief that everything depends on the creative act of God, is quite compatible with a degree of uncertainty or latitude about how precisely that unfolds in creative time."

The Roman Catholic Church now explicitly accepts the theory of evolution, (albeit with most conservatives and traditionalists within the Church in dissent), as do Anglican scholars such as John Polkinghorne, arguing that evolution is one of the principles through which God created living beings. Earlier examples of this attitude include Frederick Temple, Asa Gray and Charles Kingsley, who were enthusiastic supporters of Darwin's theories on publication, and the French Jesuit priest and geologist Pierre Teilhard de Chardin, who saw evolution as confirmation of his Christian beliefs, despite condemnation from Church authorities for his more speculative theories.

Liberal theology assumes that Genesis is a poetic work, and that just as human understanding of God increases gradually over time, so does the understanding of his creation. In fact, both Jews and Christians have been considering the idea of the creation narrative as an allegory (instead of an historical description) long before the development of Darwin's theory of evolution. Two notable examples are Saint Augustine (4th century) who, on theological grounds, argued that everything in the universe was created by God in the same instant, (and not in seven days as a plain account of Genesis would require) and the 1st century Jewish scholar Philo of Alexandria, who wrote that it would be a mistake to think that creation happened in six days, or in any set amount of time.

== See also ==
- Anti-intellectualism
- Faith and rationality
