= Sloshing bucket model of evolution =

Theory in evolutionary biology

The sloshing bucket model of evolution is a theory in evolutionary biology that describes how environmental disturbances varying in magnitude will affect the species present. The theory emphasizes the causal relationship between environmental factors that impinge and affect genealogical systems, providing an overarching view that determines the relationship between the variety of biological systems.

This theory was developed by Niles Eldredge, a U.S. biologist and paleontologist, and published in the journal 'Evolutionary Dynamics: Exploring the Interplay of Selection, Accident, Neutrality and Function ' where Eldredge introduces his sloshing bucket model in the article titled: 'The Sloshing Bucket: How the Physical Realm Controls Evolution'.

== Summary ==
The sloshing bucket model uses the imagery of water representing species sloshing back and forth in the environment, represented by the bucket. Disturbances in the environment are represented by the movement of the bucket, creating the sloshes. Starting off, small sloshes/disturbances do not spill any water; stasis of the current species are dominant. However, as physical disturbances grow in magnitude and size, the sloshes will result in large amounts of water spilling out, representing the extinction and speciation of the organisms present.

An example Eldredge uses is the dinosaurs, which were the prevalent life form on earth for 150 million years, surviving smaller sloshes in the bucket without much evolutionary change. It was not until the Mesozoic asteroid impact that extinction occurred to the dinosaurs and after a lag of five to seven million year, did mammals begin to speciate and diversify.

== The three patterns in life ==
=== Stasis ===
Built directly off his previous paper titled 'Punctuated equilibria', the stasis pattern of life represents periods of 'dynamic, non-regular oscillation' of intra-population variation. Stasis does not mean a species collective genome is stable, but instead still are in constant flux and variation, just in non-specific directions. This results similar phenotypes between organisms.

Fossil records further supports this idea, as with negligible or little disruptions, no evolution or adaptive change in detectable in the fossil records. It is not until larger scale and larger magnitude ecological disruptions does the fossil record drastically change.

Visual illustration of stasis followed by speciation

Causes of this stasis comes from the fact that to cause genetic shifts in an entire species require a selection force that spans all members of a species. Environmental factors though wide-spread, are out-paced by the movement of species, who find recognisable habitats to resettle and remain unchanged. Called habitat tracking, this idea states that species are able to track habitats better than natural selection can follow the changing environment.

Even in exceptional circumstances such as drastic climate change, variation in many factors such as initial genomes, mutational history and selection pressures across the species means a whole species is unlikely to be headed down a specific evolutionary direction.

Overall, the stasis pattern of life is the dominant pattern in life and results generally in no net evolutionary changes.

=== Speciation and adaptive change ===
While stasis was the dominant pattern in life, adaptive change and the resultant creation of new species arises in short burst, 'punctuating' the equilibrium set by stasis. The discontinuity of species arises not purely from accumulating genetic changes, but in conjunction with reproductive isolation.

This form of allopatric speciation has many plausible models, for which Eldredge describes one. Optimal habitat location generally are the center of a species range, with outer limits of the location being marginally useful. Sections of the species at these peripheral zones may adapt to the differing ecosystem, thus changing the fringe habitat area into the now optimal area for the newly isolated population.

=== Synchronous speciation and extinction ===
Amalgamation of the pattern 1 (stasis) and pattern 2 (adaptive change) creates the final pattern signaled by large scale change in species caused by significant enough changes in the environment on a global scale. When the increasing environmental stress reaches a certain threshold, it causes widespread extinction and speciation, alongside migration. This pattern includes whole regions, encompassing all species-level taxa, affecting them all equally. However, each species responds differently. Some species survive unchanged while others become extinct or speciate.

There are multiple documented phenomena that collaborate with this pattern very well. Carlton E.E Brett showed a 'coordinated stasis' through fossil patterns, demonstrating both a period of stasis where 70%-85% of species remain throughout a period, and after a large scale regional event, only around 20% make it through to the next period of stasis.

This pattern has also been labelled by the term 'turnover pulse' by Elisabeth Vrba. She documented gradual drop in temperature in now South Africa during the Pliocene epoch which initially had little effect. Then suddenly after half a million years, it caused an abrupt environmental change: from damp woodlands to savannahs. The same pattern of stasis punctuated by speciation and change occurred here.

Eldredge suggests that these mass extinction events 'rather than driving speciation, simply increases the probability of survival of fledgling species'.

== Genealogical and ecological dual hierarchy ==
The double-hierarchy of genealogy and ecology is needed due to the dual nature of organisms. All organisms do two main things; they exist by interacting with environment to gain energy, and they reproduce. These two distinct actions then each exist within their own hierarchy, but are tied together at the organism level through natural selection and variation.

=== Genealogical hierarchy ===
The genealogical hierarchy exist as a consequence of the spatial distribution of reproduction in species. The levels within the hierarchy ascend with increasing size and geographic range, and are each subjected to corresponding factors in the ecological hierarchy.

The lowest level in the genealogical hierarchy is the organism, specially in its reproductive sense. These organism participate the reproduction of the overall species. The next level up in the hierarchy are 'deme' who are the interbreeding local population of a species. These can be thought of as specific regional variations of the species that interbreed. The next and second highest level in the hierarchy are species. The final and highest level in the genealogical hierarchy are monophyletic taxa, who all share and come from a common ancestor.

=== Ecological hierarchy ===
The ecological hierarchy similarly starts at the lowest level in organism, though in this case, focusing on their economic pursuit of survival. These organisms either compete, cooperate or are neutral towards each other in their survival. The next level are the 'avatars' which differ from demes. Avatars are local interacting conspecifics focused on survival, rather than reproduction. The combination and interactions between avatars then make up the next level: the local ecosystem. The topmost and final layer in the hierarchy involves the region ecosystems, which are collections of local ecosystems.

== The sloshing bucket ==
By integrating the above dual hierarchy system along with the established three patterns of evolutionary life, the sloshing bucket model of evolution can be fully realised. The spatio-temporal scale of environmental or physical disturbances can be looked at through certain levels within the hierarchy, depending on their magnitude and effect.

First Level: Short term effects within the deme or avatar level. There is no net evolutionary change, resulting in stasis.

Second Level: Mid term effects, localised in specific regions. Stabilising selection occurs as adjacent demes or species fill in lost components, re-establishing the same previous hierarchy.

Third Level: Large scale environmental changes. Lasting from ten's of years to thousand or more years, these changes are slow enough to allow species to migrate to more optimal environments. Consequently due to habitat tracking, there are some changes in lower levels of hierarchy, but overall, species prevails and stasis is upheld.

Fourth Level: Regional disturbances. Where changes are too rapid for habitat tracking, the third pattern of life occurs. At this threshold, extinction and speciation is triggered on a large scale across unrelated species.

Fifth Level: Global disturbances. Essentially mass extinction events which completely overhaul the existing species. Extinction and speciation is common and widespread throughout the world. Examples include the End-Permian extinction event.

== Reception and criticism ==
The sloshing bucket model of evolution has been well received by some evolutionary biologists. Fellow philosopher and biologist Telmo Pievani states that, 'hierarchy theory is able to cover all the levels that make the evolutionary game so complex, from genes to organisms to species and the largest ecological scenarios'. Palaeontologists Bruce Lieberman and Elisabeth Vrba have stated that the sloshing bucket model contained in hierarchy theory 'play(s) a prominent role in shaping the major features of diversity and biological organization'.

There have also been some criticisms of the model. One of the larger issues with the sloshing bucket model of evolution is the missing mechanism of ecological inheritance. As this form of inheritance does not implicate reproduction or economic survival, it does not fit neatly into either of the two hierarchies, leaving a conceptual rift in the theory. Similarly, different methods of inheritance such as epigenetic and symbolic that are present in other evolutionary biology theories disrupt the hierarchical structure of the sloshing bucket model. Additionally, the more externalist viewpoint adopted by the sloshing bucket model, though distinct from adaptationism, presents another difficult concept for some biologists to agree with.

Evolutionary biologist Stephen Jay Gould further criticises the arbitrary and exclusively selective definition of an individual and the subsequent groups that then follow from these individuals. Biologist David Morrison also points out the confounding nature of network interactions upon strict hierarchies. Both ecological and genealogical systems are not strictly hierarchical, and questions 'to what extent the hierarchies dominate the network connections.'

== Applications of the model ==
The sloshing bucket model of evolution has been applied by Daniel Brooks in explaining the evolutionary biology of emerging infectious diseases (EID). Published in 2007, it uses the sloshing bucket model to explain the driving causes of these EID, stating that there are 'evolutionary accidents waiting to happen, requiring only the catalyst of climate change. . .' As regional ecological disturbances grow in frequency, episodic bursts of newly mutated and potentially more infectious and deadly diseases will also become more frequent.

Furthermore, specifically the genealogical hierarchical has been observed to be a foundation for the field of evolutionary psychology. This is reasoned as social systems are a product of biology, which result within the genealogical hierarchy.
