= Applications of evolution =

Practical application of biological evolution

Evolutionary biology, in particular the understanding of how organisms evolve through natural selection, is an area of science with many practical applications. Creationists often claim that the theory of evolution lacks any practical applications; however, this claim has been refuted by scientists.

== Wider biology ==
The evolutionary approach is key to much current research in biology that does not set out to study evolution per se, especially in organismal biology and ecology. For example, evolutionary thinking is key to life history theory. Annotation of genes and their function relies heavily on comparative, that is evolutionary, approaches. The field of evolutionary developmental biology investigates how developmental processes work by using the comparative method to determine how they evolved.

== Artificial selection ==
A major technological application of evolution is artificial selection, which is the intentional selection of certain traits in a population of organisms. Humans have used artificial selection for thousands of years in the domestication of plants and animals. More recently, such selection has become a vital part of genetic engineering, with selectable markers such as antibiotic resistance genes being used to manipulate DNA in molecular biology. It is also possible to use repeated rounds of mutation and selection to evolve proteins with particular properties, such as modified enzymes or new antibodies, in a process called directed evolution.

== Medicine ==
Schematic representation of how antibiotic resistance evolves via natural selection. The top section represents a population of bacteria before exposure to an antibiotic. The middle section shows the population directly after exposure, the phase in which selection took place. The last section shows the distribution of resistance in a new generation of bacteria. The legend indicates the resistance levels of individuals.

Antibiotic resistance can be a result of point mutations in the pathogen genome at a rate of about 1 in 10^{8} per chromosomal replication. The antibiotic action against the pathogen can be seen as an environmental pressure; those bacteria which have a mutation allowing them to survive will live on to reproduce. They will then pass this trait to their offspring, which will result in a fully resistant colony.

Understanding the changes that have occurred during organism's evolution can reveal the genes needed to construct parts of the body, genes which may be involved in human genetic disorders. For example, the Mexican tetra is an albino cavefish that lost its eyesight during evolution. Breeding together different populations of this blind fish produced some offspring with functional eyes, since different mutations had occurred in the isolated populations that had evolved in different caves. This helped identify genes required for vision and pigmentation, such as crystallins and the melanocortin 1 receptor. Similarly, comparing the genome of the Antarctic icefish, which lacks red blood cells, to close relatives such as the Antarctic rockcod revealed genes needed to make these blood cells.

== Computer science ==
As evolution can produce highly optimised processes and networks, it has many applications in computer science. Here, simulations of evolution using evolutionary algorithms and artificial life started with the work of Nils Aall Barricelli in the 1960s, and was extended by Alex Fraser, who published a series of papers on simulation of artificial selection. Artificial evolution became a widely recognised optimisation method as a result of the work of Ingo Rechenberg in the 1960s and early 1970s, who used evolution strategies to solve complex engineering problems. Genetic algorithms in particular became popular through the writing of John Holland. As academic interest grew, dramatic increases in the power of computers allowed practical applications, including the automatic evolution of computer programs. Evolutionary algorithms are now used to solve multi-dimensional problems more efficiently than software produced by human designers, and also to optimise the design of systems.
