= Catagenesis (biology) =

Term from evolutionary biology

Catagenesis is a somewhat archaic term from evolutionary biology referring to evolutionary directions that were considered "retrogressive." It was a term used in contrast to anagenesis, which in present usage denotes the evolution of a single population into a new form without branching lines of descent.

The earliest written reference to catagenesis comes from Edward Drinker Cope, in his article, On Catagenesis, published in The American Naturalist in 1884. In this article, he defines the "primitive energy", which evolution through time has specialized. He defines catagenesis as a return to the "primitive energy".

== See also ==
- Evolutionary biology
