= Mosaic evolution =

Evolution of characters at various rates both within and between species

Mosaic evolution (or modular evolution) is the concept, mainly from palaeontology, that evolutionary change takes place in some body parts or systems without simultaneous changes in other parts. Another definition is the "evolution of characters at various rates both within and between species".^{408} Its place in evolutionary theory comes under long-term trends or macroevolution.

== Background ==
In the neodarwinist theory of evolution, as postulated by Stephen Jay Gould, there is room for differing development, when a life form matures earlier or later, in shape and size. This is due to allomorphism. Organs develop at differing rhythms, as a creature grows and matures. Thus a "heterochronic clock" has three variants: 1) time, as a straight line; 2) general size, as a curved line; 3) shape, as another curved line.

When a creature is advanced in size, it may develop at a smaller rate. Alternatively, it may maintain its original size or, if delayed, it may result in a larger sized creature. That is insufficient to understand heterochronic mechanism. Size must be combined with shape, so a creature may retain paedomorphic features if advanced in shape or present recapitulatory appearance when retarded in shape. These names are not very indicative, as past theories of development were very confusing.

A creature in its ontogeny may combine heterochronic features in six vectors, although Gould considers that there is some binding with growth and sexual maturation. A creature may, for example, present some neotenic features and retarded development, resulting in new features derived from an original creature only by regulatory genes. Most novel human features (compared to closely related apes) were of this nature, not implying major change in structural genes, as was classically considered.

== Taxonomic range ==
It is not claimed that this pattern is universal, but there is now a wide range of examples from many different taxa, including:

- Hominid evolution: the early evolution of bipedalism in Australopithecines, and its modification of the pelvic girdle took place well before there was any significant change in the skull, or brain size.
- Archaeopteryx. Nearly 150 years ago, Thomas Henry Huxley compared Archaeopteryx with a small theropod dinosaur, Compsognathus. Both fossils came from the Solnhofen Limestone in Bavaria. Huxley showed that the two were very similar, except for the front limbs and feathers of Archaeopteryx. His interest was in the basic affinity of birds and reptiles, which he united as the clade Sauropsida. The peculiarity here is that the rest of the skeleton had not changed.
- Meadow voles during the last 500,000 years.
- The pterosaur Darwinopterus. The type species, D. modularis was the first known pterosaur to display features of both long-tailed (rhamphorhynchoid) and short-tailed (pterodactyloid) pterosaurs.
- Evolution of the horse, in which the major changes took place at different times, not all simultaneously.
- Mammalian evolution, especially during the Mesozoic provides a clear and well-understood example.

== Mosaic evolution (in hominin) ==
Although mosaic evolution is usually seen in terms of animals such as Darwin's finches, it can also be seen in the evolutionary process of hominin. To help further explain the meaning of mosaic evolution in hominin, mosaicism will get broken down into three subgroups. Group 1 includes related species developing independently, of which carry deep variability in their own morphological structure. Examples of this can be seen within comparisons of A. sediba, H. naledi, and H. floresiensis. Group 2 relies on the different environmental impacts on the changes of a species. An example of this is the variability of bipedalism forming independently within all related species of hominin. Lastly, Group 3 involves the presence of behavior such as the human vernacular. Language is a mosaic composite of various elements working together for one specific attribute, and this is not a single trait an offspring can inherit directly. In addition, it has been shown that an increase in social interactions corresponds to the evolution of human intelligence or in other words, an increase in brain size. This is provided and shown by Robin Dunbar's social brain hypothesis. Moreover, this can be used as a level of transition in human evolution; of which also includes dental shapes.

Brain size has shown intra-specific mosaic variability within its own development, as these differences are a result of environmental limitations. In other words, independent variability of brain structure is seen more when brain regions are unassociated from one another, ultimately, giving rise to perceptible features. When comparing current brain size and capacity between humans and chimpanzees, the ability to predict the evolutionary change between their ancestors was incredibly insightful. This granted the discovery that "local spatial interactions" were the main effect of the limitations. Furthermore, alongside the cranial capacity and structure of the brain, dental shape provides another example of mosaicism.

Using fossil record, dental shape showed mosaic evolution within the canine teeth found in early hominin. Reduction of canine sizes are seen as an authentication mark of human ancestor evolution. However, A. anamensis, discovered in Kenya, was found to have the largest mandibular canine root as part of Australopithecus evolution. This alters the authentication mark because the dimorphism between root and crown reduction has not been assessed. Although canine reduction has probably occurred prior to the evolution of Australopithecus, "changes in canine shape, in both crowns and roots, occurred in a mosaic fashion throughout the A. anamensis–afarensis lineage".

== See also ==
- Co-adaptation
- Coevolution
- Coextinction
- Convergent evolution
- Evolutionary developmental biology
- Parallel evolution
