= Criticism of evolutionary psychology =

Controversy in psychology

Evolutionary psychology seeks to identify and understand human psychological traits that have evolved in much the same way as biological traits, through adaptation to environmental cues. Furthermore, it tends toward viewing the vast majority of psychological traits, certainly the most important ones, as the result of past adaptions, which has generated significant controversy and criticism from competing fields. These criticisms include disputes about the testability of evolutionary hypotheses, cognitive assumptions such as massive modularity, vagueness stemming from assumptions about the environment that leads to evolutionary adaptation, the importance of non-genetic and non-adaptive explanations, as well as political and ethical issues in the field itself.

Evolutionary psychologists contend that a number of the criticisms against it are straw men, based on an incorrect nature versus nurture dichotomy, and/or based on misunderstandings of the discipline. In addition, some defenders of evolutionary psychology - such as American biologist and skeptic Jerry Coyne - assert that critics of the discipline base their criticisms on a priori political assumptions, such as those associated with "blank-slateism—which may stem partly from the Marxist faith in the infinite malleability of humans". Dismissing arguments based on the arguers supposed ideological commitments--without engaging the actual arguments--shows the Ad hominem fallacy. Similarly, a modal invocation of a particular imaginary of Marxism without support demonstrates false attribution and tendentiousness.

== Examples of critics and defenders ==
The history of the debate from a critic's perspective is detailed by Gannon (2002). Critics of evolutionary psychology include the philosophers of science David Buller (author of Adapting Minds), Robert C. Richardson (author of Evolutionary Psychology as Maladapted Psychology), and Brendan Wallace (author of Getting Darwin Wrong: Why Evolutionary Psychology Won't Work). Other critics include neurobiologists like Steven Rose (who edited Alas, Poor Darwin: Arguments against Evolutionary Psychology), biological anthropologists like Jonathan Marks, and social anthropologists like Tim Ingold and Marshall Sahlins.

Responses defending evolutionary psychology against critics have been published in books including Segerstråle's Defenders of the Truth: The Battle for Science in the Sociobiology Debate and Beyond (2000), Barkow's Missing the Revolution: Darwinism for Social Scientists (2005), and Alcock's The Triumph of Sociobiology (2001). Other responses to critics include Confer et al. (2010), Tooby and Cosmides (2005), and Hagen (2005). Furthermore, in one frequently quoted rebuttal of most such critics, psychologist Anne Campbell posited that such people merely believe "evolution stops at the neck".

== Criticism of key assumptions ==
=== Massive modularity ===
Evolutionary psychologists have postulated that the mind is composed of cognitive modules specialized to perform specific tasks. Evolutionary psychologists have theorized that these specialized modules enabled our ancestors to react quickly and effectively to environmental challenges. As a result, domain-specific modules would have been selected for, whereas broad general-purpose cognitive mechanisms that worked more slowly would have been eliminated in the course of evolution.

A number of cognitive scientists have criticized the modularity hypothesis,, for example, citing neurological evidence of brain plasticity and changes in neural networks in response to environmental stimuli and personal experiences. Steven Quartz and Terry Sejnowski, for example, have argued that the view of the brain as a collection of specialized circuits, each chosen by natural selection and built according to a "genetic blueprint", is contradicted by evidence that cortical development is flexible and that areas of the brain can take on different functions. Neurobiological research does not support the assumption by evolutionary psychologists that higher-level systems in the neocortex responsible for complex functions are massively modular. Peters (2013) cites neurological research showing that higher-order neocortical areas can become functionally specialized by way of synaptic plasticity and the experience-dependent changes that take place at the synapse during learning and memory. As a result of experience and learning processes the developed brain can look modular although it is not necessarily innately modular. However, Klasios (2014) responds to Peters' critique.

Another criticism is that there is little empirical support in favor of the domain-specific theory. Leading evolutionary psychologists Leda Cosmides and John Tooby have found that performance on the selection task is content-dependent: People find it easier to detect violations of "if-then" rules when the rules can be interpreted as cheating on a social contract. From this Cosmides and Tooby and other evolutionary psychologists concluded that the mind consisted of domain-specific, context-sensitive modules (including a cheater-detection module). Critics have suggested that Cosmides and Tooby use untested evolutionary assumptions to eliminate rival reasoning theories and that their conclusions contain inferential errors. Davies et al., for example, have argued that Cosmides and Tooby did not succeed in eliminating the general-purpose theory because the adapted Wason selection task they used tested only one specific aspect of deductive reasoning and failed to examine other general-purpose reasoning mechanisms (e.g., reasoning based on syllogistic logic, predicate logic, modal logic, and inductive logic etc.). Furthermore, Cosmides and Tooby use rules that incorrectly represent genuine social exchange situations. Specifically, they posit that someone who received a benefit and does not pay the cost is cheating. However, in real-life social exchange situations people can benefit and not pay without cheating (as in the case of receiving gifts or benefiting from charity).

Some critics have suggested that our genes cannot hold the information to encode the brain and all its assumed modules. Humans share a significant portion of their genome with other species and have corresponding DNA sequences so that the remaining genes must contain instructions for building specialized circuits that are absent in other mammals.

=== Environment of evolutionary adaptedness ===
One method employed by evolutionary psychologists is using knowledge of the environment of evolutionary adaptedness (EEA) to generate hypotheses regarding possible psychological adaptations. Part of the critique of the scientific basis of evolutionary psychology is that it often assumes that human evolution occurred in a uniform environment, whereas critics suggest that we know so little about the environment (or probably multiple environments) in which Homo sapiens evolve, that explaining specific traits as an adaption to that environment becomes highly speculative.

The evolutionary psychologists John Tooby and Leda Cosmides state that research is confined to certainties about the past, such as pregnancies only occurring in women, and that humans lived in groups. They argue that there are multiple environmental features that are known regarding our species' evolutionary history. They argue that our hunter-gatherer ancestors dealt with predators and prey, food acquisition and sharing, mate choice, child rearing, interpersonal aggression, interpersonal assistance, diseases and a host of other fairly predictable challenges that constituted significant selection pressures. Knowledge also include things such as nomadic, kin-based lifestyle in small groups, long life for mammals, low fertility for mammals, long female pregnancy and lactation, cooperative hunting and aggression, tool use, and sexual division of labor. Tooby and Cosmides thus argue that enough can be known about the EEA to make hypotheses and predictions.

David Buss also argued that the EEA could be sufficiently known to make predictions in evolutionary psychology. Buss argued that aspects of the environment are known - the Earth's gravity was the same, as was its atmosphere. Dinosaurs and giant Carboniferous insects were extinct and humans still lived in groups, while there were two sexes. Groups consisted of old and young members, healthy and sick, varying degrees of relatedness and so on. Buss notes that while some critics agree that the general environment is known, the specific selection pressures might never be understood due to being highly context sensitive. David Buller used an analogy including birds, observing that while all male birds must attract all female birds, they do so in different ways; Buller alleges that the evidence is simply not available to be able to determine which the specific mate-attraction problems for humans. However, Buss argues that this can be solved by proposing different evolutionary psychology hypotheses and uses data, confirmation strategies and discovery heuristics to determine which ones can be advanced. Furthermore, Buss argues this criticism is selectively sceptical - Buss notes that Buller had no problem writing confidently about the evolved mate functions of bird species, of whom there is even less knowledge about selective pressures, so it is not clear why Buller is willing to infer the mating strategies of ancestral birds by analysing living ones yet is unwilling to infer the mating strategies of ancient humans by analysing living humans.

John Alcock argues that the fact that a number of traits in humans are presently adaptive is suggestive that they originally developed as adaptions. This is because if an organism diverges too much from its original environment, it is unlikely that its traits will be adaptive to the new, changed environment and it is at risk of going extinct. Thus evolutionary psychologists doubt that the modern world is largely novel compared to that of the EEA.

Steven Pinker argues that there is enough evidence available about the historical environments humans evolved in for evolutionary psychologists to make inferences and predictions from. Pinker argues that the evidence indicates that the ancestral environment lacked "agriculture, contraception, high-tech medicine, mass media, mass-produced goods, money, police, armies, communities of strangers, and other modern features", which Pinker argues all have profound implications for minds that evolved in such an environment.

== Testability of hypotheses ==
A frequent criticism of evolutionary psychology is that its hypotheses are difficult or impossible to test, challenging its status as an empirical science. As an example, critics point out that multiple current traits likely evolved to serve different functions from those they do now, confounding attempts to make backward inferences into history. Evolutionary psychologists acknowledge the difficulty of testing their hypotheses but assert it is nevertheless possible.

Critics argue that a number of hypotheses put forward to explain the adaptive nature of human behavioural traits are "just-so stories"; neat adaptive explanations for the evolution of given traits that do not rest on any evidence beyond their own internal logic. They allege that evolutionary psychology can predict many, or even all, behaviours for a given situation, including contradictory ones. Therefore, some human behaviours will always fit some hypotheses. Noam Chomsky argued:

"You find that people cooperate, you say, 'Yeah, that contributes to their genes' perpetuating.' You find that they fight, you say, 'Sure, that's obvious, because it means that their genes perpetuate and not somebody else's. In fact, just about anything you find, you can make up some story for it."

Leda Cosmides argued in an interview:

"Those who have a professional knowledge of evolutionary biology know that it is not possible to cook up after the fact explanations of just any trait. There are important constraints on evolutionary explanation. More to the point, every decent evolutionary explanation has testable predictions about the design of the trait. For example, the hypothesis that pregnancy sickness is a byproduct of prenatal hormones predicts different patterns of food aversions than the hypothesis that it is an adaptation that evolved to protect the fetus from pathogens and plant toxins in food at the point in embryogenesis when the fetus is most vulnerable – during the first trimester. Evolutionary hypotheses – whether generated to discover a new trait or to explain one that is already known – carry predictions about the nature of that trait. The alternative – having no hypothesis about adaptive function – carries no predictions whatsoever. So which is the more constrained and sober scientific approach?"

A 2010 review article by evolutionary psychologists describes how an evolutionary theory may be empirically tested. A hypothesis is made about the evolutionary cause of a psychological phenomenon or phenomena. Then the researcher makes predictions that can be tested. This involves predicting that the evolutionary cause will have caused other effects than the ones already discovered and known. Then these predictions are tested. The authors argue a number of evolutionary theories have been tested in this way and confirmed or falsified. Buller (2005) makes the point that the entire field of evolutionary psychology is never confirmed or falsified; only specific hypotheses, motivated by the general assumptions of evolutionary psychology, are testable. Accordingly, he views evolutionary psychology as a paradigm rather than a theory, and attributes this view to prominent evolutionary psychologists including Cosmides, Tooby, Buss, and Pinker.

In his review article "Discovery and Confirmation in Evolutionary Psychology" (in The Oxford Handbook of Philosophy of Psychology) Edouard Machery concludes:

"Evolutionary psychology remains a very controversial approach in psychology, maybe because skeptics sometimes have little first-hand knowledge of this field, maybe because the research done by evolutionary psychologists is of uneven quality. However, there is little reason to endorse a principled skepticism toward evolutionary psychology: Although clearly fallible, the discovery heuristics and the strategies of confirmation used by evolutionary psychologists are on a firm grounding."

Steve Stewart-Williams argues, in response to claims that evolutionary psychology hypotheses are unfalsifiable, that such claims are logically incoherent. Stewart-Williams argues that if evolutionary psychology hypotheses can't be falsified, then neither could competing explanations, because if alternative explanations (e.g. sociocultural hypotheses) were proven true, this would automatically falsify the competing evolutionary psychology hypothesis, so for competing explanations to be true, then evolutionary psychology hypothesis must be false and thus falsifiable.

Edward Hagen observes that critics of evolutionary psychology often argue that because a trait could have evolved as an adaptation or a by-product, it is impossible to determine which it is since it evolved in a past environment and thus evolutionary psychology hypotheses about a traits origin are untestable. According to Hagen, critics using this argument have a flawed understanding of science; Hagen argues that science is fundamentally an abductivist methodology e.g. inference to the best explanation. Hagen argues that hypotheses compete to provide the best explanation of a phenomenon, where "best" is measured via criteria like predicting new and surprising observations, parsimony, coherence and so on. Abduction does not require scientist to provide direct evidence for every single prediction. Evolutionary psychology hypotheses make predictions and thus compete with other hypotheses to explain traits. Hagen further argues that while some critics conclude that evolutionary psychology explanations for mental traits cannot be true because they can't be tested for the above reasons, this is a false conclusion to draw; even if evolutionary psychology hypotheses could not be tested, this does not mean they are false, it just means the evidence for them could not be acquired, not that traits don't exist because of evolutionary reasons.

Dominic Murphy explains that one of the most common objections to evolutionary psychology is the "time machine" argument. This is the argument that while evolutionary psychology can make predictions about things we should see in the modern world if the evolutionary psychology hypothesis is true, there are too many alternative explanations for the origin of a trait which would also predict this phenomenon e.g. a trait evolving as a by-product could predict the same evidence as the same trait evolving as an adaptation. Therefore, a potentially infinite number of alternative historical explanations are possible. Thus without a time machine, it is impossible to determine which possible explanation for the evidence seen in the modern day is correct. Murphy argues this argument is flawed on multiple grounds. Firstly, if an explanation for a trait is forwarded and a prediction for what we would see in the modern day is made based on that explanation, then one cannot just propose alternative explanations. Instead, these alternative explanations require testable predictions of their own to be forwarded, preferably multiple different predictions. In addition, not all explanations may predict the same evidence, thus Murphy argues that if one explanation predicts a great deal of evidence for modern day observations and alternative explanations struggle to explain this, then it is reasonable to have confidence in the former explanation. In addition, Murphy argues that if the "time machine" argument was applied to other sciences, it would lead to absurd results - Murphy observes that cosmologists have confirmed predictions about the Big Bang by studying available astronomical evidence and current understanding of particle physics, with no need for a time machine to travel back to the beginning of the universe. Similarly, geologists and physicists investigating the hypothesis that it was an asteroid impact that caused the extinction of the dinosaurs did so by looking for modern day evidence. Murphy thus concludes that the onus is on the sceptics to prove why evolutionary psychology is allegedly untestable on "time machine" grounds if other historical sciences are not, as "methods should be judged across the board, not singled out for ridicule in one context."

A similar argument was made by Andrew Goldfinch, who argued that this entire criticism is due to the issue of underdetermination - multiple rival explanations can potentially accommodate a phenomenon, making it difficult to discern which explanation is the correct one. Furthermore, one can also challenge the interpretation of an experiment's results, revise an explanation to accommodate a novel fact or even question the reliability of the experiments conducted. However, Goldfinch argues that this is a ubiquitous problem in all of science and not unique to evolutionary psychology, so it is not clear why this is seen as a criticism of the field if it would be dismissed elsewhere. Lastly, Goldfinch argues that one way to distinguish between competing explanations is to make a distinction between programmes that makes new predictions and discovers novel facts and those programmes that simply accommodate the fresh discoveries of other programmes. Those programmes which are actually making and testing predictions should be favoured over those simply accommodating the discoveries of others.

Adam Hunt has proposed that 'Just-so story' critiques can be avoided if a systematic approach for assessing a trait is developed, applicable to every describable trait an organism possesses. This 'DCIDE' Method (Description, Categorisation, Integration, Depiction, Evaluation) aims to counter cherry-picking, 'reasoning from the conclusion' and 'just-so' critiques by providing a repeatable formula for weighing the evidence prior to the selection of a specific organism trait to explain.

== Alleged disregard for alternate explanations ==
=== Environmental explanations ===
Critics assert that evolutionary psychology has trouble developing research that can distinguish between environmental and cultural explanations on the one hand and adaptive evolutionary explanations on the other. Some studies have been criticized for their tendency to attribute to evolutionary processes elements of human cognition that may be attributable to social processes (e.g. preference for particular physical features in mates), cultural artifacts (e.g. patriarchy and the roles of women in society), or dialectical considerations (e.g. behaviours in which biology interacts with society, as when a biologically determined skin colour determines how one is treated). Evolutionary psychologists are frequently criticized for ignoring the vast bodies of literature in psychology, anthropology, sociology, archaeology, linguistics, philosophy, history, and the natural sciences. Both sides of the debate stress that statements such as "biology vs. environment" and "genes vs. culture" amount to false dichotomies, and outspoken critics of sociobiology such as Richard Lewontin, Steven Rose and Leon Kamin helped to popularise a "dialectical" approach to questions of human behaviour, where biology and environment interact in complex ways to produce what we see.

Evolutionary psychologists Confer et al. argue that evolutionary psychology fully accepts nature-nurture interactionism, and that it is possible to test the theories in order to distinguish between different explanations.

=== Other evolutionary mechanisms ===
Critics point out that within evolutionary biology there are multiple other non-adaptive pathways along which evolution can move to produce the behaviors seen in humans today. Natural selection is not the only evolutionary process that can change gene frequencies and produce novel traits. Genetic drift is caused by chance variation in the genes, environment, or development. Evolutionary by-products are traits that were not specially designed for an adaptive function, although they may also be species-typical and may also confer benefits on the organism. A "spandrel" is a term coined by Gould and Lewontin (1979a) for traits which confer no adaptive advantage to an organism, but are 'carried along' by an adaptive trait. Gould advocates the hypothesis that cognition in humans came about as a spandrel: "Natural selection made the human brain big, but most of our mental properties and potentials may be spandrels – that is, nonadaptive side consequences of building a device with such structural complexity". Once a trait acquired by some other mechanism confers an adaptive advantage, it may be open to further selection as an "exaptation". Gould argues that one cannot mistake the utility of a trait in the current environment for its adaptive origin. On the other hand, evolutionary psychologists suggest that critics misrepresent their field, and that empirical research in evolutionary psychology is designed to help identify which psychological traits are prone to adaptations, but also which are not.

Edward Hagen argued evolutionary psychology's reliance on adaptive explanations is grounded in the fact that the existence and survival of life is highly improbable. Hagen argues that most organisms do not survive to reproduce and that is only through adaptations that organisms can hope to do so; alternate explanations like genetic drift are only relevant if an organism can survive and reproduce in the first place and it is the fact that organisms do manage survive and reproduce, despite the odds against such a thing occurring, that evolutionary psychologists are interested in. Similarly, Steven Pinker argues that complex organs like eyes require multiple precise parts in exacting arrangements, which indicates they evolved via selective pressure, as it would be extremely improbable for such an arrangement to arise fortuitously out of genetic drift or as a byproduct of another trait. Hagen also argues that a way to distinguish spandrels from adaptations is that adaptations have evidence of design (that is to say they did not simply arise by pure chance but were selected for). While Hagen agrees that one can risk over-attributing adaptation, he observes that one can also risk under-attributing it as well. Hagen argues that tonsils can become infected and it needs to be known whether or not it is safe to remove them. Insisting that tonsils could just be spandrels is not helpful, whereas hypothesising that they may be adaptations allows one to make predictions about them to see if they do have a function and thus whether or not it is safe to remove them. Conversely, Steve Stewart-Williams argues that it is not true that evolutionary psychologists do not consider non-adaptive explanations, arguing that evolutionary psychologists have suggested alternate explanations such as byproducts, observing that the hypothesis that obesity is caused by a mismatch between ancestral and modern environments is one of the most famous cases of a byproduct explanation in evolutionary psychology. Pinker makes a similar argument, arguing that evolutionary psychology has long held the view that things such as art, music, science, religion and dreams are probably byproducts or spandrels of other mental traits.

Laith Al-Shawaf argues that evolutionary psychologists use adaptations as a starting point for research - if the evidence in favour of the adaptation hypothesis fails to materialise, evolutionary psychologists will abandon it, so it is untrue to claim that evolutionary psychologists do not consider alternate hypotheses. Sven Walter observes that while critics of adaptationist hypotheses argue that alternative evolutionary explanations could exist, what these alternative explanations are and how they lead to the kind of traits evolutionary psychologists study is not always elaborated upon (for example, if a trait is proposed to be a byproduct rather than an adaptation, it is not always clear what it is supposed to be a byproduct of). Thus Walter argues that if there is no reasonably plausible alternative hypothesis, if the adaptationist hypotheses is logically plausible and if empirical evidence exists to support it, then there is thus reasonable support for the evolutionary psychologist's adaptationist hypothesis.

Steven Gangstead argues that demonstrating that a trait is beneficial is not sufficient to prove it is an adaptation. Rather, to show something is an adaptation it must be shown that it exhibits special design. Special design is when a trait performs a function (function meaning it increases the reproductive fitness of the organism) effectively and it is difficult to conceive of an alternative scenario where the trait would have evolved. Gangstead observes that the eye is an extreme example, as it is highly effective at the function of seeing, yet it is difficult to conceive of a scenario through which it would have evolved other than one where it was selected for its optical properties and thereby its function of sight. Evolutionary psychologists have also argued that a lack of special design is evidence of a trait being a byproduct rather than an adaptation; for example, it has been found that men find women's scent more attractive when they are fertile phase than their infertile luteal phase. While men finding this scent more attractive may be an adaptation, there is no evidence that women possess the adaptation to smell better when fertile, instead it is likely a byproduct of changing hormone levels, which men have been selected to detect and differently evaluate. Evolutionary psychologists consider evidence that a trait is an adaptation if it has many features that are improbably well suited to solving an ancestral adaptive problem, that the phenotypic properties are unlikely to have arisen by chance alone and that the trait is not better explained as a byproduct or the consequence of some other adaptive problem. To show a trait is a byproduct, it must be shown that something else is an adaptation and then that the trait in question is a side effect of that adaptation. Co-opted exaptationist and spandrel hypotheses have an additional evidentiary burden compared to adaptationist hypotheses, as they must identify both the later co-opted functionality and the original adaptational functionality, as well as what caused the trait to be co-opted to their new function; it is not sufficient simply to propose an alternative exaptationist or spandrel hypotheses to the adaptationist one, rather these evidentiary burdens must be met. Leda Cosmides argues that raising the objection that a trait could be a spandrel is meaningless because an organism contains a potentially infinite number of spandrels. Instead, one must demonstrate what the trait is a spandrel of, rather than simply just suggesting it could be a spandrel.

Berry et al. argue that critics of adaptationist hypotheses are often guilty of uncritically accepting any alternative explanation provided it is not the adaptationist one. Furthermore, the authors argue that while critics insist that "adapative function" refer only to original adaptive function the trait evolved for, they argue that this is a nonsensical requirement. This is because if an adaptation was then used for a new, different, adaptive function, then this makes the trait an adaptation because it remains in the population because it helps organisms with this new function. Thus the trait's original purpose is irrelevant because it has been co-opted for a new purpose and maintains itself within the species because it increases reproductive success of members of the species who have it (versus those who may have lost it for some reason); nature is blind to the original "intended" function of the trait.

Durrant et al. agree that alternative explanations to adaptation have to be considered. The authors argue that an issue with adaptationist explanations is underdetermination. A theory is underdetermined when the evidence used to support it could be equally used to support one or more other competing theories. Underdetermination is an issue in science due to the problem of induction; in the great majority of cases, the truth of the data does not deductively entail the truth of the hypothesis. While this is an issue in general in science, sciences which deal with unobserved entities and processes, which evolutionary psychology does, are particularly vulnerable. Even if the theory can make predictions, these predictions do not necessarily confirm the hypothesis, as competing theory could also predict it; the authors argue that the prediction of novel facts does not necessarily mean acceptance of the theory, historically speaking, observing that while Einstein's theory of general relativity is famously held as being accepted because it predicted light would bend around black holes (which was unknown at the time), neither Einstein nor many of his contemporaries regarded it as a strong confirmation of his theory. Durrant et al. thus propose that the problem of underdetermination can be solved by judging competing theories on a range of criteria to determine which one best explains phenomena by having the best explanatory coherence; criteria suggested include explanatory breadth (which theory explains the great range of facts), simplicity (which theory requires the fewest special assumptions) and analogy (the theory is supported by analogy to theories scientists already find credible). Thus any criticism of adaptationist theories must demonstrate that an alternative theory offers greater explanatory coherence than the adaptationist one.

== Other overall areas of criticism ==
=== Alleged ethnocentrism ===
One aspect of evolutionary psychology is finding traits that have been shown to be universal in humans. A number of critics have pointed out that some traits considered universal at some stage by evolutionary psychologists often turn out to be dependent on cultural and particular historical circumstances. Critics allege that evolutionary psychologists tend to assume that their own current cultural context represents a universal human nature. For example, anthropologist Susan McKinnon argues that evolutionary theories of kinship rest on ethnocentric presuppositions. Evolutionary psychologists assert that the degree of genetic relatedness determines the extent of kinship (e.g., solidarity, nurturance, and altruism) because in order to maximize their own reproductive success, people "invest" only in their own genetic children or closely related kin. Steven Pinker, for instance, stated "You're either someone's mother or you aren't". McKinnon argues that such biologically centered constructions of relatedness result from a specific cultural context: the kinship category "mother" is relatively self-evident in Anglo-American cultures where biology is privileged but not in other societies where rank and marital status, not biology, determine who counts as a mother or where mother's sisters are also considered mothers and one's mother's brother is understood as the "male mother".

However, evolutionary psychologists point out that their research actually focuses on commonalities between people of different cultures to help to identify "human psychological nature" and cultural universals. It is not a focus on local behavioral variation (which may sometimes be considered ethnocentric) that interests evolutionary psychologists; rather their focus is to find underlying psychological commonalities between people from various cultures.

=== Alleged reductionism and determinism ===
Some critics view evolutionary psychology as influenced by genetic determinism and reductionism.

Evolutionary psychology is based on the theory that human physiology and psychology are influenced by genes. Evolutionary psychologists assume that genes contain instructions for building and operating an organism and that these instructions are passed from one generation to the next via genes.

Lickliter and Honeycutt (2003) have argued that evolutionary psychology is a predeterministic and preformationistic approach that assumes that physical and psychological traits are predetermined and programmed while virtually ignoring non-genetic factors involved in human development. Even when evolutionary psychologists acknowledge the influence of the environment, they reduce its role to that of an activator or trigger of the predetermined developmental instructions presumed to be encoded in a person's genes. Lickliter and Honeycutt have stated that the assumption of genetic determinism is most evident in the theory that learning and reasoning are governed by innate, domain-specific modules. Evolutionary psychologists assume that modules preexist individual development and lie dormant in the structure of the organism, awaiting activation by some (usually unspecified) experiential events. Lickliter and Honeycutt have opposed this view and suggested that it is the entire developmental system, including the specific features of the environment a person actually encounters and interacts with (and not the environments of distant ancestors) that brings about any modularity of cognitive function.

Critics argue that a reductionist analysis of the relationship between genes and behavior results in a flawed research program and a restricted interpretation of the evidence, creating problems for the creation of models attempting to explain behavior. Lewontin, Rose, and Kamin instead advocate a dialectical interpretation of behavior in which "it is not just that wholes are more than the sum of their parts, it is that parts become qualitatively new by being parts of the whole". They argue that reductionist explanations such as the hierarchical reductionism proposed by Richard Dawkins will cause the researcher to miss dialectical ones. Similarly, Hilary Rose criticizes evolutionary psychologists' explanations of child abuse as excessively reductionist. As an example she cites Martin Daly and Margot Wilson's theory that stepfathers are more abusive because they lack the nurturing instinct of natural parents and can increase their reproductive success in this way. According to Rose this does not explain why most stepfathers do not abuse their children and why some biological fathers do. She also argues that cultural pressures can override the genetic predisposition to nurture as in the case of sex-selective infanticide prevalent in some cultures where male offspring are favored over female offspring.

Evolutionary psychologists Workman and Reader reply that while reductionism may be a "dirty word" to some it is actually an important scientific principle. They argue it is at the root of discoveries such as the world being made up of atoms and complex life being the result of evolution. At the same time they emphasize that it is important to look at all "levels" of explanations, e.g. both psychologists looking at environmental causes of depression and neuroscientists looking the brain contribute to different aspects of our knowledge of depression. Workman and Reader also deny the accusation of genetic determinism, asserting that genes usually do not cause behaviors absolutely but predispose to certain behaviors that are affected by factors such as culture and an individual's life history.

Steven Pinker argues that the charge of reductionism is a straw man and that evolutionary psychologists are aware that organisms develop due to complex interactions between genes and the environment. Pinker argues that Lewontin, Rose and Kamin misrepresented Dawkins in this regard. Pinker argues that when evolutionary psychologists talk about genes "causing" behaviour, they mean that said gene increases the probability of a behaviour occurring compared to other genes, which is averaged out of the organism's evolutionary timescale and the environments it has lived in. Pinker argues that this is a nonreductionist and nondeterminist view of genes, which is common in evolutionary biology.

=== Disjunction and grain problems ===
Some have argued that even if the theoretical assumptions of evolutionary psychology turned out to be true, it would nonetheless lead to methodological problems that would compromise its practice. The disjunction and grain problems are argued to create methodological challenges related to the indeterminacy of evolutionary psychology's adaptive functions. That is, the inability to correctly choose, from a number of possible answers to the question: "what is the function of a given mechanism?"

The disjunction problem occurs when a mechanism appears to respond to one thing (F), but is also correlated with another (G). Whenever F is present, G is also present, and the mechanism seems to respond to both F and G. The difficulty thus involves deciding whether to characterize the mechanism's adaptive function as being related to F, G, or both. "For example, a frogs pre-catching mechanism responds to flies, bees, food pellets, etc.; so is its adaptation attuned to flies, bees, fleebees, pellets, all of these, or just some?"

The grain problem refers to the challenge in knowing what kind of environmental 'problem' an adaptive mental mechanism might have solved. As summarized by Sterenly & Griffiths (1999): "What are the problems 'out there' in the environment? Is the problem of mate choice a single problem or a mosaic of many distinct problems? These problems might include: When should I be unfaithful to my usual partner? When should I desert my old partner? When should I help my sibs find a partner? When and how should I punish infidelity?" The grain problem therefore refers to the possibility that an adaptive problem may actually involve a set of nested 'sub-problems' "which may themselves relate to different input domains or situations. Franks states that "if both adaptive problems and adaptive solutions are indeterminate, what chance is there for evolutionary psychology?"

Franks also states that "The arguments in no sense count against a general evolutionary explanation of psychology" and that by relaxing assumptions the problems may be avoided, although this may reduce the ability to make detailed models.

=== Neglect of individual genetic differences ===
A common critique is that evolutionary psychology does not address the complexity of individual development and experience and fails to explain the influence of genes on behavior in individual cases. Evolutionary psychologists respond that their discipline is not primarily concerned with explaining the behavior of specific individuals, but rather broad categories of human behaviors across societies and cultures. It is the search for species-wide psychological adaptations (or "human nature") that distinguishes evolutionary psychology from purely cultural or social explanations. These psychological adaptations include cognitive decision rules that respond to different environmental, cultural, and social circumstances in ways that are (on average) adaptive.

=== Replication crisis ===
Evolutionary psychology has been subject to scrutiny as part of the broader replication crisis in psychological science. A growing number of studies have failed to replicate key findings related to mating preferences, risk-taking, and hormonal influences, raising questions about the robustness of several foundational claims.

A 2015 large-scale replication effort by the Open Science Collaboration attempted to replicate 100 psychological studies from high-impact journals. While 97% of the original studies reported statistically significant results, only 36% of the replications did so, and replication effect sizes were on average about half those of the originals (r = .197 vs. r = .403). These results suggested that a number of psychological effects, including those in evolutionary psychology, may be less robust than previously assumed.

Several well-known evolutionary psychology effects have come under direct challenge. For example, the hypothesis that women's preferences for facial masculinity fluctuate across the ovulatory cycle has failed to replicate in high-powered studies using salivary hormone assays and within-subject designs. One such study (N = 584) found no compelling evidence linking hormonal changes to masculinity preferences, contradicting prior research based on less rigorous methods. Similarly, replication attempts have found no reliable effect of mating-related priming on risk-taking or consumer behavior, and no consistent evidence for the "watching eyes" effect that predicted prosocial behavior in the presence of subtle cues of observation.

Critics argue that findings in evolutionary psychology are especially vulnerable to researcher degrees of freedom and p-hacking. Harris, Pashler, and Mickes (2014) noted that flexible analytical decisions, such as the selection of fertility windows, can dramatically alter results and may have contributed to false-positive findings in studies on ovulatory effects.

== Specific areas of controversy ==
=== Rape and attraction to aggression ===
Smith et al. (2001) criticized Thornhill and Palmer's hypothesis that a predisposition to rape in certain circumstances might be an evolved sexually dimorphic psychological adaptation. They developed a fitness cost/benefit mathematical model and populated it with estimates of certain parameters (some parameter estimates were based on studies of the Aché in Paraguay). Their model suggested that, on average, the costs of rape for a typical 25-year-old male outweigh benefits by a factor of ten to one. On the basis of their model and parameter estimates, they suggested that this would make it unlikely that rape generally would have net fitness benefits for most men. They also find that rape from raiding other tribes has lower costs but does not offer net fitness benefits, making it also unlikely that was an adaptation.

Beckerman et al. (2009) disputed explanations of male aggression as a reproductive strategy. In a study of the Waorani tribes, the most aggressive warriors had the fewest descendants.

=== Waist-to-hip ratios ===
Others have criticized the assertion that men universally preferred women with a waist-to-hip ratio (WHR) of 0.7 or the "hourglass" figure. Studies of peoples in Peru and Tanzania found that men preferred ratios of 0.9. Cashdan (2008), investigating why the average WHR among women was higher than 0.7, wrote that a higher WHR was associated with higher levels of cortisol and androgens, and argued that these hormones caused better stress response, and higher assertiveness and competitiveness, respectively. She argued that these effects were also adaptive and counteracted the mate-attracting and fecundity effects of lower WHR, and that women's WHR was higher where they are more dependent on their own hard work or where the environment is difficult, and lower in societies where they gain resources by attracting a mate, with male preferences shifting accordingly. A 2019 review of multiple hypotheses concluded that researchers should focus on differentiating the conclusions of different analyses of these hypotheses, considering a lot of the contradictions within the data and the vague definitions of "mate-value". Recent studies utilizing stimuli that match what is found in the local culture show that men display a cross-cultural consensus in preferring a low waist-to-hip ratio (i.e., hourglass-like figure), with some fluctuation depending on whether the local ecology is nutritionally stressed. Congenitally-blind men also display a preference for hourglass figures in women.

=== Behaviors that reduce reproductive success ===
"Maladaptive" behaviors such as homosexuality and suicide seem to reduce reproductive success and pose a challenge for evolutionary psychology. Evolutionary psychologists have proposed explanations, such that there may be higher fertility rates for the female relatives of homosexual men, thus progressing a potential homosexual gene, or that they may be byproducts of adaptive behaviors that usually increase reproductive success. However, a review by Confer et al. states that they "remain at least somewhat inexplicable on the basis of current evolutionary psychological accounts".

== Debate over implications ==
=== Ethical ===
Many critics have argued that evolutionary psychology and sociobiology justify existing social hierarchies and reactionary policies. Evolutionary psychologists have been accused of conflating "is" and "ought", and evolutionary psychology has been used to argue against social change (because the way things are now has been evolved and adapted) and against social justice (e.g. the argument that the rich are only rich because they've inherited greater abilities, so programs to raise the standards of the poor are doomed to fail).

It has also been suggested by critics that evolutionary psychologists' theories and interpretations of empirical data rely heavily on ideological assumptions about race and gender. Halford Fairchild, for example, argues that J. Philippe Rushton's work on race and intelligence was influenced by preconceived notions about race and was "cloaked in the nomenclature, language and 'objectivity'" of evolutionary psychology, sociobiology and population genetics.

Moreover, evolutionary psychology has been criticized for its ethical implications. Richardon (2007) and Wilson et al. (2003) have cited the theories in A Natural History of Rape where rape is described as a form of mate choice that enhances male fitness as examples. Critics have expressed concern over the moral consequences of such evolutionary theories and some critics have understood them to justify rape. However, a 2011 study found that after reading an article on evolutionary psychology theories, men did not judge male criminal sexual behaviour significantly differently to a control group, while those exposed to an article on sociocultural theory judged criminal sexual behaviour much more harshly than both the control and evolutionary psychology groups; the authors speculate that the study participants had a native bias towards the evolutionary psychology theory that was temporarily trumped by exposure to the alternative theory, while acknowledging that this short-term study does not reflect larger-scale and longer-term impacts of theory on behaviour.

Evolutionary psychologists caution against committing the naturalistic fallacy – the idea that "ought can be derived from is" and that "what is natural" is necessarily a moral good. In the book The Blank Slate, Steven Pinker contends that critics have committed two logical fallacies:

The naturalistic fallacy is the idea that what is found in nature is good. It was the basis for Social Darwinism, the belief that helping the poor and sick would get in the way of evolution, which depends on the survival of the fittest. Today, biologists denounce the Naturalistic Fallacy because they want to describe the natural world honestly, without people deriving morals about how we ought to behave -- as in: If birds and beasts engage in adultery, infanticide, cannibalism, it must be OK. The moralistic fallacy is that what is good is found in nature. It lies behind the bad science in nature-documentary voiceovers: lions are mercy-killers of the weak and sick, mice feel no pain when cats eat them, dung beetles recycle dung to benefit the ecosystem and so on. It also lies behind the romantic belief that humans cannot harbor desires to kill, rape, lie, or steal because that would be too depressing or reactionary.

Similarly, the authors of A Natural History of Rape, Thornhill and Palmer, as well as McKibbin et al. respond to allegations that evolutionary psychologists legitimizes rape by arguing that their critics' reasoning is a naturalistic fallacy in the same way it would be a fallacy to accuse the scientists doing research on the causes of cancer of justifying cancer. Instead, they argue that understanding the causes of rape may help create preventive measures.

=== Political ===
Part of the controversy has consisted in each side accusing the other of holding or supporting extreme political viewpoints: evolutionary psychology has often been accused of supporting right-wing politics, whereas critics have been accused of being motivated by Marxist view points.

Linguist and activist Noam Chomsky has said that evolutionary psychologists often ignore evidence that might harm the political status quo:

The founder of what is now called "sociobiology" or "evolutionary psychology"-the natural historian and anarchist Peter Kropotkin-concluded from his investigations of animals and human life and society that "mutual aid" was a primary factor in evolution, which tended naturally toward communist anarchism...Of course, Kropotkin is not considered the founding figure of the field and is usually dismissed if mentioned at all, because his quasi-Darwinian speculations led to unwanted conclusions.

Chomsky has also said that not enough is known about human nature to point to any political conclusions.

In a review of Steven Pinker's book The Blank Slate, which draws partially on evolutionary psychology, Louis Menand wrote:

In general, the views that Pinker derives from 'the new sciences of human nature' are mainstream Clinton-era views: incarceration is regrettable but necessary; sexism is unacceptable, but men and women will always have different attitudes toward sex; dialogue is preferable to threats of force in defusing ethnic and nationalist conflicts; most group stereotypes are roughly correct, but we should never judge an individual by group stereotypes; rectitude is all very well, but 'noble guys tend to finish last'; and so on.

Evolutionary psychologist Glenn Wilson argues that "promoting recognition of the true power and role of instincts is not the same as advocating the total abandonment of social restraint". Left-wing philosopher Peter Singer in his book A Darwinian Left has argued that the view of human nature provided by evolution is compatible with and should be incorporated into the ideological framework of the Left.

Researchers conducted a 2007 study investigating the views of a sample of 168 United States PhD psychology students. The authors concluded that those who self-identified as adaptationists were much less conservative than the general population average. They also found no differences compared to non-adaptationist students and found non-adaptationists to express a preference for less strict and quantitative scientific methodology than adaptationists. A 2012 study found that evolutionary anthropology students were largely of a left-liberal political stance and differed little in political opinions from those of other psychology students.

== See also ==
- Biopsychiatry controversy
