= Social effects of evolutionary theory =

Effects on human societies of the scientific explanation of life's diversity

The social effects of evolutionary thought have been considerable. As the scientific explanation of life's diversity has developed, it has often displaced alternative, sometimes very widely held, explanations. Because the theory of evolution includes an explanation of humanity's origins, it has had a profound impact on human societies. Some have vigorously denied acceptance of the scientific explanation due to its perceived religious implications (e.g. its implied rejection of the special creation of humans presumably described in the Bible). This has led to a vigorous conflict between creation and evolution in public education, primarily in the United States.

== Evolution and ethics ==
The theory of evolution by natural selection has also been adopted as a foundation for various ethical and social systems, such as social Darwinism, an idea that preceded the publication of The Origin of Species, popular in the 19th century, which holds that "the survival of the fittest" (a phrase coined in 1851 by Herbert Spencer, 8 years before Darwin published his theory of evolution) explains and justifies differences in wealth and success among societies and people. A similar interpretation was one created by Darwin's cousin, Francis Galton, known as eugenics, which claimed that human civilization was subverting natural selection by allowing the less bright and less healthy to survive and out-breed the smarter and more healthy.

Later advocates of this theory suggested radical and often coercive social measures in an attempt to "correct" this imbalance. Thomas Huxley spent much time demonstrating through a series of thought experiments that it would not only be immoral, but impossible. Stephen Jay Gould and others have argued that social Darwinism is based on misconceptions of evolutionary theory, and many ethicists regard it as a case of the is-ought problem. After the atrocities of the Holocaust became linked with eugenics, it greatly fell out of favor with public and scientific opinion, though it was never universally accepted by either, and at no point in Nazi literature is Charles Darwin or the scientific theory of evolution mentioned.

In his book The End of Faith, Sam Harris argues that Nazism was largely a continuation of Christian anti-Semitism. Jim Walker compiled a list of 129 quotes from Mein Kampf in which Hitler described himself as a Christian, or mentioned God, Jesus or a biblical passage. Some argue that six million of the people killed during the Holocaust were killed because of their religion (Judaism) not their race, "strength," or any reason with an obvious link to the mechanism of Darwinian evolution. Hitler often used Christian beliefs like, "Jews killed Jesus," to justify his anti-Semitism.

The notion that humans share ancestors with other animals has also affected how some people view the relationship between humans and other species. Many proponents of animal rights hold that if animals and humans are of the same nature, then rights cannot be distinct to humans.

Charles Darwin, in fact, considered "sympathy" to be one of the most important moral virtues — and that it was, indeed, a product of natural selection and a trait beneficial to social animals (including humans). Darwin further argued that the most "sympathetic" societies would consequently be the most "successful." He also stated that our sympathy should be extended to "all sentient beings":

As man advances in civilization, and small tribes are united into larger communities, the simplest reason would tell each individual that he ought to extend his social instincts and sympathies to all the members of the same nation, though personally unknown to him. This point being once reached, there is only an artificial barrier to prevent his sympathies extending to the men of all nations and races. If, indeed, such men are separated from him by great differences in appearance or habits, experience unfortunately shows us how long it is, before we look at them as our fellow-creatures. ... This virtue, one of the noblest with which man is endowed, seems to arise incidentally from our sympathies becoming more tender and more widely diffused, until they are extended to all sentient beings. As soon as this virtue is honored and practiced by some few men, it spreads through instruction and example to the young, and eventually becomes incorporated in public opinion.

— Charles Darwin; The Descent of Man, 1871

== Evolution and religion ==
Before Darwin's argument and presentation of the evidence for evolution, Western religions generally discounted or condemned any claims that diversity of life is the result of an evolutionary process, as did most scientists in the English scientific establishment. However, evolution was accepted by some religious groups such as the Unitarian church and the liberal Anglican theologians who went on to publish Essays and Reviews, as well as by many scientists in France and Scotland and some in England, notably Robert Edmund Grant. Literal or authoritative interpretations of Scripture hold that a supreme being directly created humans and other animals as separate Created kinds, which to some means species. This view is commonly referred to as creationism. From the 1920s to the present in the US, there has been a strong religious backlash to the teaching of evolution theory, particularly by conservative evangelicals. They have expressed concerns about the effects of the teaching of evolution on society and their faith (see Creation–evolution controversy).

In response to the wide scientific acceptance of the theory of evolution, many religions have formally or informally synthesized the scientific and religious viewpoints. Several important 20th century scientists (Fisher, Dobzhansky) whose work confirmed Darwin's theory, were also Christians who saw no incompatibility between their experimental and theoretical confirmations of evolution and their faith. Some religions have adopted a theistic evolution viewpoint, where God provides a divine spark that ignited the process of evolution and (or) where God has guided evolution in one way or another.

=== Evolution and the Roman Catholic Church ===
The Roman Catholic Church, beginning in 1950 with Pope Pius XII's encyclical Humani Generis, took up a neutral position with regard to evolution. "The Church does not forbid that...research and discussions, on the part of men experienced in both fields, take place with regard to the doctrine of evolution, in as far as it inquires into the origin of the human body as coming from pre-existent and living matter."

In an October 22, 1996, address to the Pontifical Academy of Sciences, Pope John Paul II updated the Church's position, recognizing that Evolution is "more than a hypothesis" - "In his encyclical Humani Generis, my predecessor Pius XII has already affirmed that there is no conflict between evolution and the doctrine of the faith regarding man and his vocation... Today, more than a half-century after the appearance of that encyclical, some new findings lead us toward the recognition of evolution as more than an hypothesis. In fact it is remarkable that this theory has had progressively greater influence on the spirit of researchers, following a series of discoveries in different scholarly disciplines."

=== Islamic views on evolution ===
Islamic views on evolution are diverse, ranging from theistic evolution to Old Earth creationism. Some Muslims around the world believe "humans and other living things have evolved over time", yet some others believe they have "always existed in present form". Some Muslims believe that the processes of life on Earth started from one single point of species with a mixture of water and a viscous clay-like substance. Muslim thinkers have proposed and accepted elements of the theory of evolution, some holding the belief of the supremacy of God in the process. Some scholars suggested that both narratives of creation and of evolution, as understood by modern science, may be believed by modern Muslims as addressing two different kinds of truth, the revealed and the empirical. Others argue that faith and science can be integrated and complement each other.

=== Jewish views on evolution ===
Jewish views on evolution includes a continuum of views about the theory of evolution, experimental evolution, the origin of life, the age of the universe, and theistic evolution. Today, many Jewish people accept the theory of evolution and do not see it as incompatible with traditional Judaism, reflecting the emphasis of prominent rabbis such as the Vilna Gaon and Maimonides on the ethical rather than factual significance of scripture.

== Evolutionary theory and the political left ==
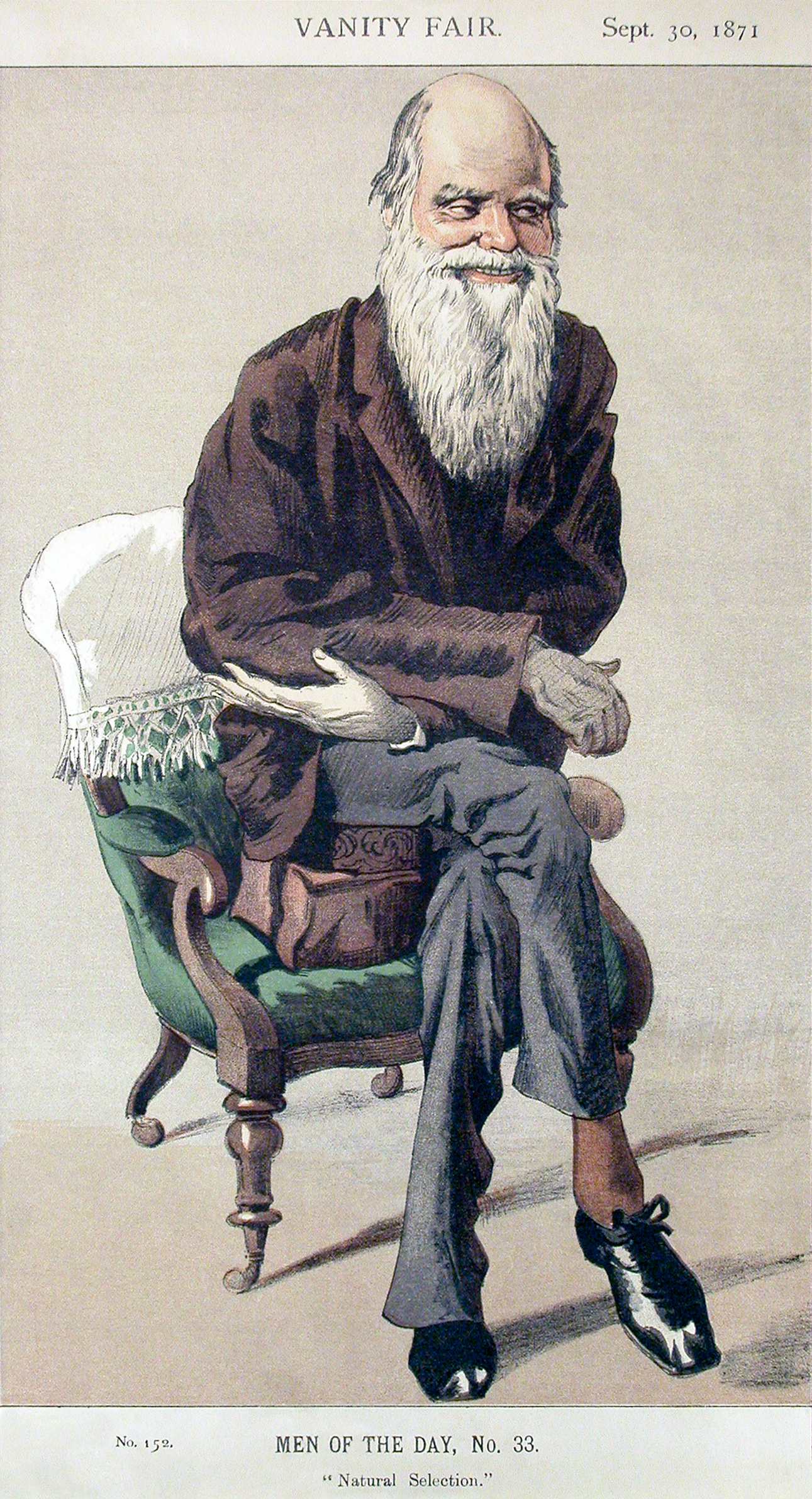
A caricature of Darwin from Vanity Fair in 1871

In 1861 Karl Marx wrote to his friend Ferdinand Lassalle, "Darwin’s work is most important and suits my purpose in that it provides a basis in natural science for the historical class struggle. ... Despite all shortcomings, it is here that, for the first time, 'teleology' in natural science is not only dealt a mortal blow but its rational meaning is empirically explained."

Most later Marxists agreed with this view, but some – particularly those in the early Soviet Union – believed that evolutionary theory conflicted with their economic and social ideals. As a result, they came to support Lamarckism instead – the idea that an organism can pass on characteristics that it acquired during its lifetime to its offspring. This led to the practice of Lysenkoism, which caused agricultural problems.

In his book, Mutual Aid: A Factor of Evolution, anarcho-communist Peter Kropotkin argued that co-operation and mutual aid are as important in the evolution of the species as competition and mutual strife, if not more so.

On the contemporary moderate left, some authors such as Peter Singer (in his book, A Darwinian Left) support Darwinism but reach different political and economic lessons than more conservative observers. Richard Dawkins' book, The Selfish Gene, has a chapter, "Nice guys finish first," that attempts to explain the role of altruism and cooperation in evolution and how social animals not only cannot survive without such traits, but how evolution will create them. Dawkins explains that when an animal sacrifices itself or uses its resources for the survival of other members of the same species, its genes, present in the other animals, survive. For example, if a mother dies to save three of its pups, one and a half copies (on average) of its genes will survive, because there is a 50% chance of a particular gene being present in its offspring. Dawkins also made a documentary of the same name. According to the documentary, Dawkins added that chapter as a way of overcoming modern day misinterpretations of the concept of survival of the fittest. Left-wing transhumanists see technology as a means to overcome inequalities that stem from biology. New left feminist Shulamith Firestone saw technological control over reproduction as essential for gender equality. More recently the Laboria Cuboniks collective has articulated an antinaturalist politics that seeks to overcome essentialist categories through technological empowerment.

== Evolution in relation to Social Darwinism and Imperialism ==
"Social Darwinism" is a derogatory term associated with the 19th century Malthusian theory developed by Whig philosopher Herbert Spencer. It is associated with evolutionary theory but now widely regarded as unwarranted. Social Darwinism was later expanded by others into ideas about "survival of the fittest" in commerce and human societies as a whole, and led to claims that social inequality, sexism, racism and imperialism were justified. However, these ideas contradict Darwin's own views, and contemporary scientists and philosophers consider these ideas to be neither mandated by evolutionary theory nor supported by data.

Social Darwinism is further linked with nationalism and imperialism. During the age of New Imperialism, the concepts of evolution justified the exploitation of "lesser breeds without the law" by "superior races." To elitists, strong nations were composed of white people who were successful at expanding their empires, and as such, these strong nations would survive in the struggle for dominance. With this attitude, Europeans, except for Christian missionaries, seldom adopted the customs and languages of local people under their empires. Christian missionaries, on the other hand, were the very first individuals to meet new peoples and develop writing systems for local inhabitants' languages that lacked one. Being critics of Social Darwinism, they ardently opposed slavery and provided an education and religious instruction to the new peoples they interacted with since they felt that this was their duty as Christians.

== See also ==
- Sociocultural evolution – Evolution of societies
- Neo-creationism – Pseudoscientific creationist movement
- Hypergamy – Practice of a person marrying a spouse of higher social status
- Natural philosophy – Philosophical study of nature
- Freethought – Position that beliefs should be formed only on the basis of logic, reason, and empiricism
- Age of the Earth – Scientific dating of the age of Earth
