= Genetic viability =

Ability of genes to allow reproduction

Genetic viability is the ability of the genes present to allow a cell, organism or population to survive and reproduce. The term is generally used to mean the chance or ability of a population to avoid the problems of inbreeding. Less commonly genetic viability can also be used in respect to a single cell or on an individual level.

Inbreeding depletes heterozygosity of the genome, meaning there is a greater chance of identical alleles at a locus. When these alleles are non-beneficial, homozygosity could cause problems for genetic viability. These problems could include effects on the individual fitness (higher mortality, slower growth, more frequent developmental defects, reduced mating ability, lower fecundity, greater susceptibility to disease, lowered ability to withstand stress, reduced intra- and inter-specific competitive ability) or effects on the entire population fitness (depressed population growth rate, reduced regrowth ability, reduced ability to adapt to environmental change). See Inbreeding depression. When a population of plants or animals loses their genetic viability, their chance of going extinct increases.

== Necessary conditions ==
To be genetically viable, a population of plants or animals requires a certain amount of genetic diversity and a certain population size. For long-term genetic viability, the population size should consist of enough breeding pairs to maintain genetic diversity. The precise effective population size can be calculated using a minimum viable population analysis. Higher genetic diversity and a larger population size will decrease the negative effects of genetic drift and inbreeding in a population. When adequate measures have been met, the genetic viability of a population will increase.

== Causes for decrease ==
Population bottleneck can decrease genetic viability leading to possible extinction

The main cause of a decrease in genetic viability is loss of habitat. This loss can occur because of, for example urbanization or deforestation causing habitat fragmentation. Natural events like earthquakes, floods or fires can also cause loss of habitat. Eventually, loss of habitat could lead to a population bottleneck. In a small population, the risk of inbreeding will increase drastically which could lead to a decrease in genetic viability. If they are specific in their diets, this can also lead to habitat isolation and reproductive constraints, leading to greater population bottleneck, and decrease in genetic viability. Traditional artificial propagation can also lead to decreases in genetic viability in some species.

=== Genetic viability of particular wolf populations ===
A small highly inbred population of gray wolves (Canis lupus) residing in Isle Royale National Park, Michigan, USA has been undergoing population decline and is nearing extinction. These gray wolves have been experiencing severe inbreeding depression primarily determined by the homozygous expression of strongly deleterious recessive mutations leading to decreased genetic viability. Reduced genetic viability due to severe inbreeding was expressed as reduced reproduction and survival as well as specific defects such as malformed vertebrae, probable cataracts, syndactyly, an unusual "rope tail," and anomalous fur phenotypes. A separate inbred Scandinavian population of gray wolves (Canis lupus), also suffering from loss of genetic viability, is experiencing inbreeding depression likely due to the homozygous expression of deleterious recessive mutations.

== Population conservation ==
Habitat protection is associated with more allelic richness and heterozygosity than in unprotected habitats. Reduced habitat fragmentation and increased landscape permeability can promote allelic richness by facilitating gene flow between populations that are isolated or smaller.

The minimum viable population needed to maintain genetic viability is where the loss of genetic variation because of small population size (genetic drift) is equal to genetic variation gained through mutation. When the numbers of one sex is too low, there may be a need for crossbreeding to maintain viability.

== Analyzing ==
When genetic viability seems to be decreasing within a population, a population viability analysis (PVA) can be done to assess the risk of extinction of this species. The result of a PVA could determine whether further action is needed regarding the preservation of a species.

== Applications ==
Genetic viability is applied by wildlife management staff in zoos, aquariums or other such ex situ habitats. They use the knowledge of the animals' genetics, usually through their pedigrees, to calculate the PVA and manage the population viability.
