= Functional extinction =

End of viability for a population

Functional extinction is the extinction of a species or other taxon such that:

1. It disappears from the fossil record, or historic reports of its existence cease;
2. The reduced population no longer plays a significant role in ecosystem function;
3. The population is no longer viable. There are no individuals able to reproduce, or the small population of breeding individuals will not be able to sustain itself due to inbreeding depression and genetic drift, which leads to a loss of fitness.

In plant populations, self-incompatibility mechanisms may cause related plant specimens to be incompatible, potentially leading to functional extinction if an entire population becomes self-incompatible. This does not occur in larger populations.

In polygynous populations, where only a few males leave offspring, there is a much smaller reproducing population than if all viable males were considered. Furthermore, successful males act as a genetic bottleneck, leading to more rapid genetic drift or inbreeding problems in small populations.

== Functionally extinct species in modern times ==
- Baiji
- Northern white rhinoceros
- Ivory-billed woodpecker
- Imperial woodpecker
- Yangtze giant softshell turtle
- South China tiger
- Bornean rhinoceros
- Vaquita
- Fernandina Island tortoise
- Hyophorbe amaricaulis
- North Atlantic right whale

On May 10, 2019, the Australian Koala Foundation issued a press release that opened with the sentence "The Australian Koala Foundation (AKF) believes Koalas may be functionally extinct in the entire landscape of Australia." The press release was reported by multiple news agencies worldwide, most of which repeated the AKF's statement. Despite this, koalas are not currently considered functionally extinct; while their population has decreased, the IUCN Red List lists them only as "Vulnerable". The AKF's press release was released on the eve of the 2019 elections in Australia, where topics such as climate change were major issues.

Distinct animal populations can also become functionally extinct. In 2011, a 3-year survey of the wildlife population in the Bénoué Ecosystem of North Cameroon (the Bénoué, Bouba-Ndjidda, and Faro national parks, and 28 hunting zones surrounding the parks) concluded that the North Cameroon population of cheetahs (Acinonyx jubatus) and African wild dogs (Lycaon pictus) was now functionally extinct. Non-Northern Cameroonian cheetahs are listed as "Vulnerable" by the IUCN Red List.

== See also ==
- Conservation genetics
- Mutational meltdown
- Small population size
- Extinction vortex
- Extinction debt
