= Extinction threshold =

Point at which a population cannot survive

Extinction threshold is a term used in conservation biology to explain the point at which a species, population or metapopulation, experiences an abrupt change in density or number because of an important parameter, such as habitat loss. It is at this critical value below which a species, population, or metapopulation, will go extinct, though this may take a long time for species just below the critical value, a phenomenon known as extinction debt.

Extinction thresholds are important to conservation biologists when studying a species in a population or metapopulation context because the colonization rate must be larger than the extinction rate, otherwise the entire entity will go extinct once it reaches the threshold.

Extinction thresholds are realized under a number of circumstances and the point in modeling them is to define the conditions that lead a population to extinction. Modeling extinction thresholds can explain the relationship between extinction threshold and habitat loss and habitat fragmentation.

== Mathematical models ==
Metapopulation-type models are used to predict extinction thresholds. The classic metapopulation model is the Levins Model, which is the model of metapopulation dynamics established by Richard Levins in the 1960s. It was used to evaluate patch occupancy in a large network of patches. This model was extended in the 1980s by Russell Lande to include habitat occupancy. This mathematical model is used to infer the extinction values and important population densities. These mathematical models are primarily used to study extinction thresholds because of the difficulty in understanding extinction processes through empirical methods and the current lack of research on this subject. When determining an extinction threshold there are two types of models that can be used: deterministic and stochastic metapopulation models.

=== Deterministic ===
Deterministic metapopulation models assume that there are an infinite number of habitat patches available and predict that the metapopulation will go extinct only if the threshold is not met.

dp/dt = chp (1-p)-ep

Where p= occupied patches, e= extinction rate, c= colonization rate, and h= amount of habitat.

A species will persist only if h> δ

where δ=e/c

δ= species parameter, or how successful a species is in colonizing a patch.

=== Stochastic ===
Stochastic metapopulation models take into account stochasticity, which is the non-deterministic or random processes in nature. With this approach a metapopulation may be above the threshold if determined that it is unlikely it will go extinct within a certain time period.

The complex nature of these models can result in a small metapopulation that is considered to be above the deterministic extinction threshold, but in reality has a high risk of extinction.

A 2025 study published in the journal PLOS One examines the critical fertility threshold needed to avoid extinction in a sexual population considering demographic stochasticity. The results indicate that the fertility rate must exceed 2.7 children per woman to prevent the extinction of the population, which is higher than the conventional replacement level of 2.1.

== Other factors ==
When using metapopulation-type models to predict extinction thresholds there are a number of factors that can affect the results of a model. First, including more complicated models, rather than relying solely on the Levins model produces different dynamics. For example, in an article published in 2004, Otso Ovaskainen and Ilkka Hanski explained with an empirical example that when factors such as Allee effect or Rescue effect were included in modeling the extinction threshold, there were unexpected extinctions in a high number of species. A more complex model came up with different results, and in practicing conservation biology this can add more confusion to efforts to save a species from the extinction threshold. Transient dynamics, which are effects on the extinction threshold because of instability in either the metapopulation or environmental conditions, is also a large player in modeling results. Landscapes that have recently endured habitat loss and fragmentation may be less able to sustain a metapopulation than previously understood without considering transient dynamics. Finally, environmental stochasticity, which may be spatially correlated, can lead to amplified regional stochastic fluctuations and therefore greatly affect the extinction risk.

== See also ==
- Ecological extinction
- Extinction vortex
- Small population size
- Population genetics
- Endangered species
- Wildlife conservation
- Ecological threshold
