= Genetic divergence =

Evolutionary process

Genetic divergence is the process in which two or more populations of an ancestral species accumulate independent genetic changes (mutations) through time, often leading to reproductive isolation and continued mutation even after the populations have become reproductively isolated for some period of time, as there is not any genetic exchange anymore. In some cases, subpopulations cover living in ecologically distinct peripheral environments can exhibit genetic divergence from the remainder of a population, especially where the range of a population is very large (see parapatric speciation). The genetic differences among divergent populations can involve silent mutations (that have no effect on the phenotype) or give rise to significant morphological and/or physiological changes. Genetic divergence will always accompany reproductive isolation, either due to novel adaptations via selection and/or due to genetic drift, and is the principal mechanism underlying speciation.

On a molecular genetics level, genetic divergence is due to changes in a small number of genes in a species, resulting in speciation. However, researchers argue that it is unlikely that divergence is a result of a significant, single, dominant mutation in a genetic locus because if that were so, the individual with that mutation would have zero fitness. Consequently, they could not reproduce and pass the mutation on to further generations. Hence, it is more likely that divergence, and subsequently reproductive isolation, are the outcomes of multiple small mutations over evolutionary time accumulating in a population isolated from gene flow.

== Causes ==
=== Founder effect ===
One possible cause of genetic divergence is the founder effect, which is when a few individuals become isolated from their original population. Those individuals might overrepresent a certain genetic pattern, which means that certain biological characteristics are overrepresented. These individuals can form a new population with different gene pools from the original population. For example, 10% of the original population has blue eyes and 90% has brown eyes. By chance, 10 individuals are separated from the original population. If this small group has 80% blue eyes and 20% brown eyes, then their offspring would be more likely to have the allele for the blue eyes. As a result, the percentage of the population with blue eyes would be higher than the population with brown eyes, which is different from the original population.

=== Bottleneck effect ===
Another possible cause of genetic divergence is the bottleneck effect. The bottleneck effect is when an event, such as a natural disaster, causes a large portion of the population to die. By chance, certain genetic patterns will be overrepresented in the remaining population, which is similar to what happens with the founder effect.

=== Disruptive selection ===
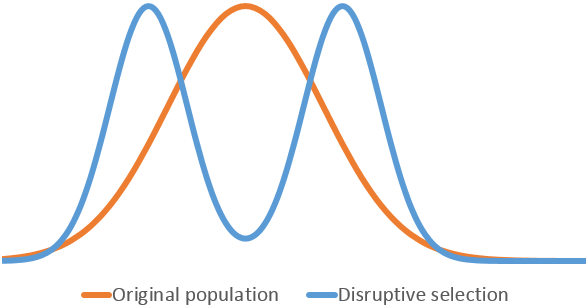
A graph showing selection for the extremes and against the mean.

Genetic divergence can occur without geographic separation, through Disruptive selection. This occurs when individuals in a population with both high and low phenotypic extremes are fitter than the intermediate phenotype. These individuals occupy two different niches, within each niche there is Gaussian trait distribution. If the genetic variation between niches is high then there will be strong reproductive isolation. If genetic variation is below a certain threshold than introgression will occur but if variation is above a certain threshold the population can split resulting in speciation.

Disruptive selection is seen in the bimodal population of Darwin's finches, Geospiza fortis. The two modes specialize in eating different types of seeds small and soft versus large and hard, this results in beaks of different sizes with different force capacities. Individuals with intermediate beak sizes are selected against. The song structure and response to song also differs between the two modes. There is minimal gene flow between the two modes of G. fortis.
