= Drift load =

Loss of biological fitness in a population due to genetic drift

In genetics and evolutionary biology, drift load, a type of genetic load, is the decline in fitness in a population due to the fixation of deleterious mutations by genetic drift. Drift load generally decreases as a function of effective population size, and is a mechanism of inbreeding depression.

If all individuals in a population become homozygous for one allele, that allele is fixed, and any other alleles at that locus are lost from that population by the random evolutionary process of genetic drift. As fixation of deleterious alleles occurs at more loci and variability is lost, drift load increases. With increasing drift load, populations become less fit with each generation, a mutational meltdown, which can lead to an extinction vortex.

Strategies to address drift load in endangered species are a goal of conservation genetics.

== Calculating drift load ==
For realistic values of $N_e$, the effective population size, and $\lambda_D$, the mean effect on fitness of all fixed deleterious mutations, the loss of fitness in each generation due to drift load, $\Delta {W_D}$, can be calculated:

$\Delta {W_D} \cong \frac{U_D}{8{N_e^2} \lambda_D}$

Here $U_D$ represents the total number of new deleterious mutations per diploid zygote.

This demonstrates that more fixed deleterious alleles in a population lead to greater reductions in fitness, unless counteracted by large effective populations or weakly deleterious effects overall.

== Decreasing drift load ==
Factors that decrease drift load, or counteract its negative effects on population fitness, include polyploidy, gene flow and purifying selection. Drift load increases more rapidly in small populations, so factors that tend to maintain large populations such as high reproductive rates and low levels of biotic and abiotic stress will reduce the incidence of drift load.

As a target of conservationists seeking to ensure endangered animals' long-term survival, drift load has been directly addressed in genetic restoration projects around the world. Some researchers caution that long-term benefits of genetic restoration and assisted gene flow may be doubtful, and these programs have risks that are not yet well-understood. Nonetheless, several projects have reported success in reducing drift load in wild populations.

=== Florida Panther ===
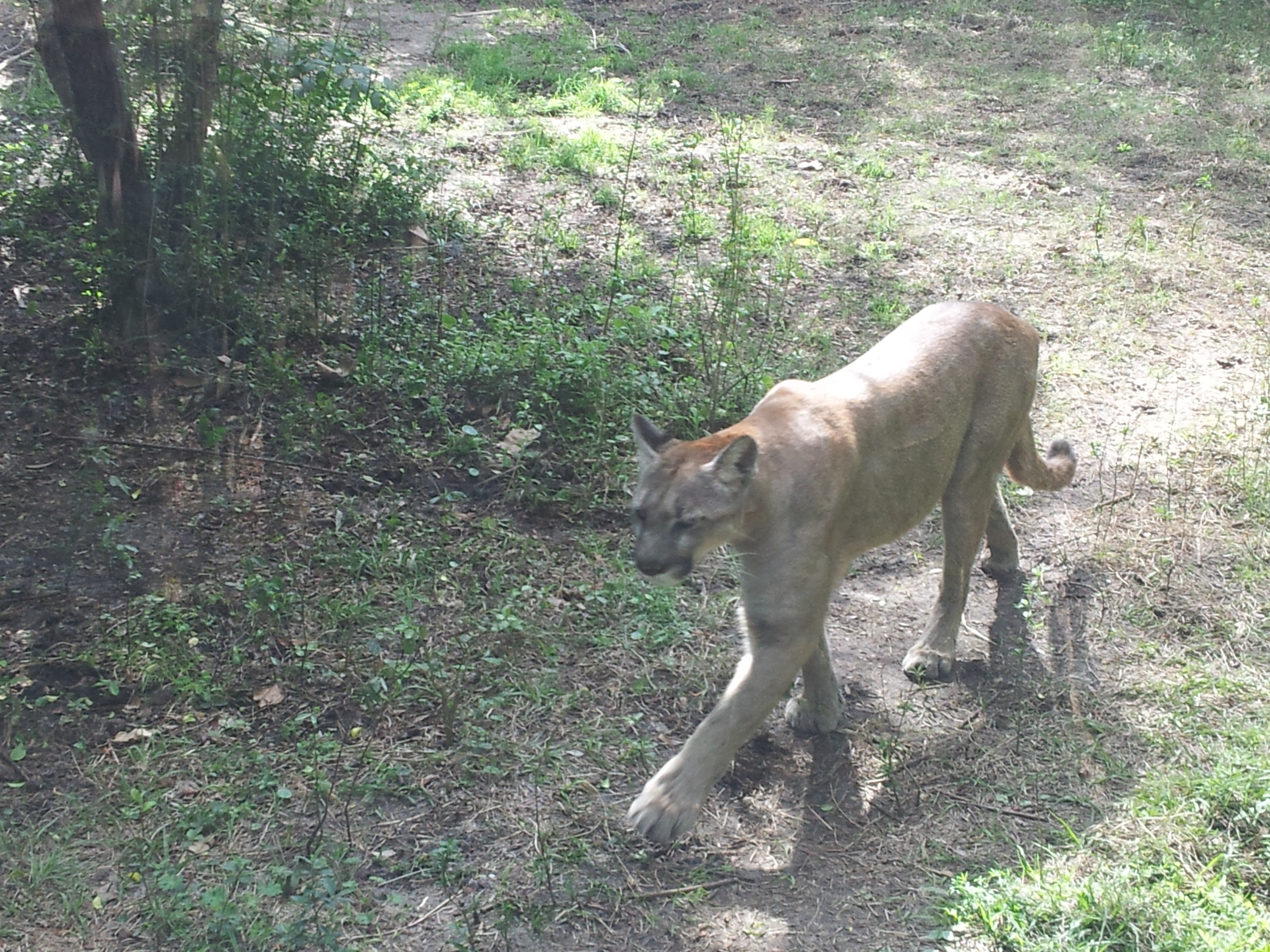
Florida panther (Felis concolor coryi)

By 1995, the Florida panther (Felis concolor coryi), with a local range between two large cities and divided by highways, was reduced to a population of 20-25 individuals in the wild. As a result of inbreeding depression and drift load, Florida panthers exhibited low genetic variability and overall fitness, as shown in congenital heart defects, high parasite and pathogen load and impaired male fertility and sperm viability. Though protected from hunting as an endangered species, models predicted the risk of extinction within 20 years as 95%.

A genetic restoration project was developed to achieve gene flow and an increase in genetic variability. Eight female panthers from Texas (Felis concolor stanleyana) were transported to join the remaining 22 Florida panthers and 4 panthers originally from the Everglades in their habitat. The results after 15 years of monitoring were a tripled population size, doubled genetic heterozygosity, a lowered incidence of congenital disorders and inbreeding correlates, and improved survival and fitness.

=== Common European adder ===
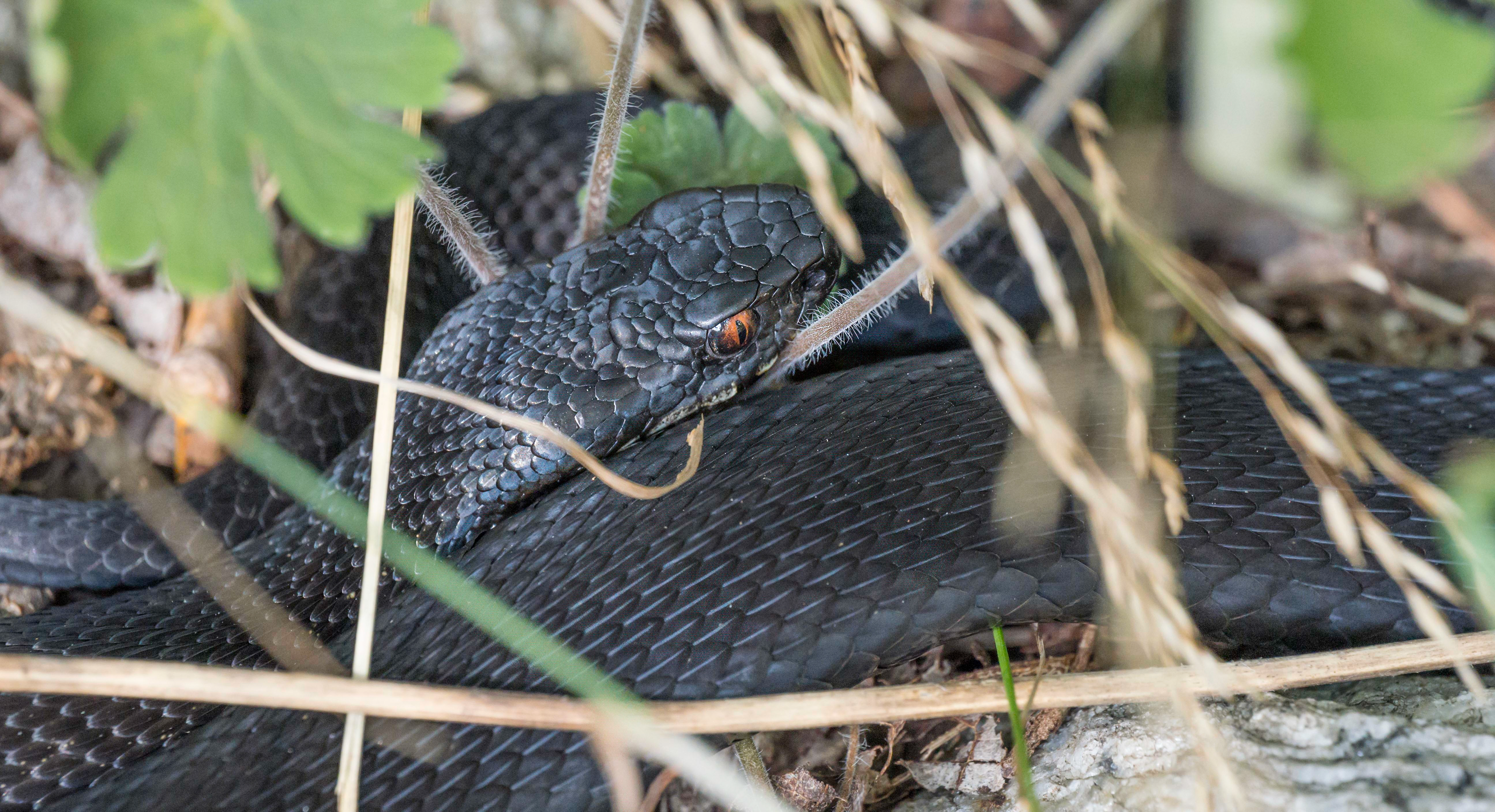
Common European adder (Vipera berus berus)

A population of adders (Vipera berus berus) in Smygehuk, Sweden had become reproductively isolated by habitat encroachment to a small strip of coastal grassland. Their numbers had declined and so had their fitness; they exhibited severe inbreeding depression and drift load, demonstrated by a high proportion of deformed or stillborn offspring and very low genetic variability. Researchers released 20 male adders from another Swedish population into the Smygehuk habitat, and after four breeding seasons captured the visiting adders and transported them back to their native range. The population grew dramatically, from about 18 to about 64 individuals during the study. Incidence of congenital defects and stillbirth fell sharply, and genetic variability greatly increased, as measured by polymorphism in MHC class I genes.

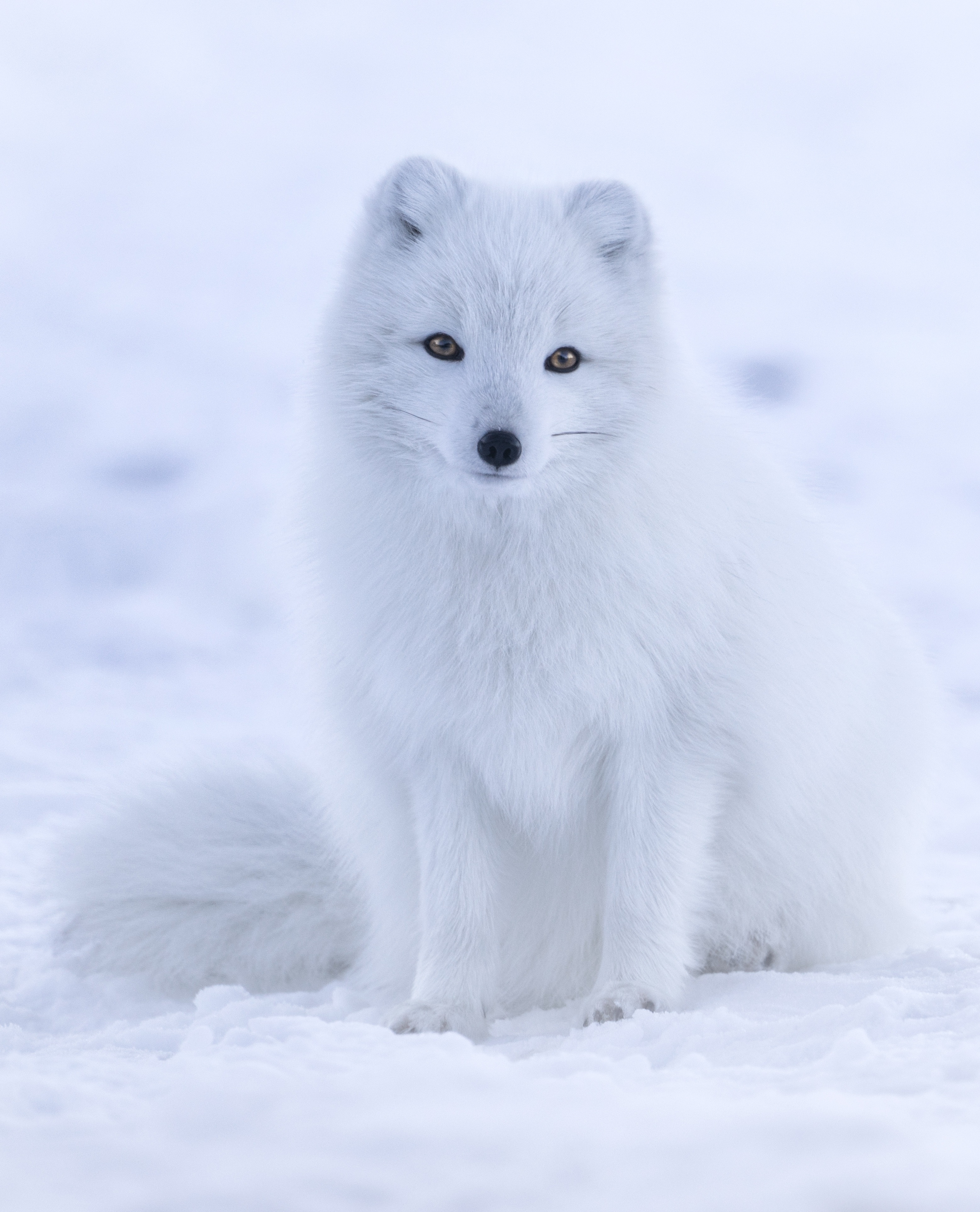
Arctic fox (Vulpes lagopus)

=== Scandinavian arctic fox ===
The Scandinavian arctic fox (Vulpes lagopus) was hunted almost to extinction for the fur trade, thereafter going through a genetic bottleneck that, in the southernmost population in Norway led to an average inbreeding coefficient higher (f = 0.14) than that of half-sibling crosses (f = 0.125). The release of three out-bred males from a captive breeding program in 2010 into this population resulted, in five years, in a doubling of the population and a large decrease in its average inbreeding coefficient to f = 0.08, with kits' first-year survival rate almost doubling, and a 41% increase in allelic richness. Five years after their introduction, 89% of litters descended from the three immigrants.
