= Genetic load =

Measure in population genetics

Genetic load is the difference between the fitness of an average genotype in a population and the fitness of some reference genotype, which may be either the best present in a population, or may be the theoretically optimal genotype. The average individual taken from a population with a low genetic load will generally, when grown in the same conditions, have more surviving offspring than the average individual from a population with a high genetic load. Genetic load can also be seen as reduced fitness at the population level compared to what the population would have if all individuals had the reference high-fitness genotype. High genetic load may put a population in danger of extinction.

== Fundamentals ==
Consider n genotypes $\mathbf{A} _1, \dots, \mathbf{A} _n$, which have the fitnesses $w_1, \dots, w_n$ and frequencies $p_1, \dots, p_n$, respectively. Ignoring frequency-dependent selection, the genetic load $L$ may be calculated as:

$$L = {{w_\max - \bar w}\over w_\max}$$

where $w_\max$ is either some theoretical optimum, or the maximum fitness observed in the population. In calculating the genetic load, $w_1 \dots w_n$ must be actually found in at least a single copy in the population, and $\bar w$ is the average fitness calculated as the mean of all the fitnesses weighted by their corresponding frequencies:

$\bar w = {\sum_{i=1}^n {p_i w_i}}$

where the $i^\mathrm{th}$ genotype is $\mathbf{A}_i$ and has the fitness and frequency $w_i$ and $p_i$ respectively.

One problem with calculating genetic load is that it is difficult to evaluate either the theoretically optimal genotype, or the maximally fit genotype actually present in the population. This is not a problem within mathematical models of genetic load, or for empirical studies that compare the relative value of genetic load in one setting to genetic load in another.

== Causes ==
=== Deleterious mutation ===
Deleterious mutation load is the main contributing factor to genetic load overall.

==== Segregating deleterious mutations ====
The Haldane-Muller theorem of mutation–selection balance says that the load depends only on the whole-genome deleterious mutation rate, $U$, and not on the selection coefficient. Specifically, relative to an ideal genotype of fitness 1, the mean population fitness is $e^{-U}$. The intuition for the lack of dependence on the selection coefficient is that, while a mutation with stronger effects causes more harm per generation, that harm is felt for fewer generations.

$U>1$ across most vertebrates implying a large mutation load. A lower bound estimate for $U$ is $U=2 \mu G_{del}P_{del}$ where $\mu$ is the per-base mutation rate, $G_{del}$ is the number of genome diploid sites where deleterious mutations can occur, and $P_{del}$ is the fraction of mutations in $G_{del}$ that are deleterious. Following this approach, human $U>2.2$. Given that this method ignores many sources of deleterious mutations some researchers suggest that human $U$ can be as high as 10.

Application of the Haldane-Muller e^{-U} formula predicts that population mean fitness will be very low, e.g. 0.007 relative to the case of no segregating deleterious mutations, if there are 5 new deleterious mutations per replication. However the reference case is unrealistic - no individual free from segregating deleterious mutations exist. ‘Soft selection’ describes competitive ability compared to other individuals in the population, as opposed to hard selection where a low fitness genotype is dead or infertile regardless of the fitness of its competitors. The reduction in mean fitness relative to the best individual actually present in a population is much lower.

Negative epistasis can make the purging of deleterious mutations more efficient, by making variance in fitness greater than that which would be expected from variance in the number of deleterious mutations. The most extreme form of negative epistasis under soft selection is truncation selection, where e.g. the 10% of individuals with the highest number of deleterious mutations fail to reproduce.

It has been estimated that each human carries, on average, around 400 deleterious mutations.

==== Fixed deleterious mutations ====
A slightly deleterious mutation may not stay in mutation–selection balance but may instead become fixed by genetic drift when its selection coefficient is less than one divided by the effective population size. Over time, the accumulation of fixed deleterious mutations can seriously impact the fitness of a population. In asexual populations, the stochastic accumulation of mutation load is called Muller's ratchet, and occurs in the absence of beneficial mutations, when after the most-fit genotype has been lost, it cannot be regained by genetic recombination. Deterministic accumulation of mutation load occurs in asexuals when the deleterious mutation rate exceeds one per replication. Sexually reproducing species are expected to have lower genetic loads. This is one hypothesis for the evolutionary advantage of sexual reproduction. Purging of deleterious mutations in sexual populations is facilitated by synergistic epistasis among deleterious mutations.

High load can lead to a small population size, which in turn increases the accumulation of mutation load, culminating in extinction via mutational meltdown.

The accumulation of deleterious mutations in humans has been of concern to many geneticists, including Hermann Joseph Muller, James F. Crow, Alexey Kondrashov, W. D. Hamilton, and Michael Lynch.

==== Beneficial mutation ====
In sufficiently genetically loaded populations, new beneficial mutations create fitter genotypes than those previously present in the population. When load is calculated as the difference between the fittest genotype present and the average, this creates a substitutional load. The difference between the theoretical maximum (which may not actually be present) and the average is known as the "lag load". Motoo Kimura's original argument for the neutral theory of molecular evolution was that if most differences between species were adaptive, this would exceed the speed limit to adaptation set by the substitutional load. However, Kimura's argument confused the lag load with the substitutional load, using the former when it is the latter that in fact sets the maximal rate of evolution by natural selection.

More recent "travelling wave" models of rapid adaptation derive a term called the "lead" that is equivalent to the substitutional load, and find that it is a critical determinant of the rate of adaptive evolution.

=== Inbreeding ===
Inbreeding increases homozygosity. In the short run, an increase in inbreeding increases the probability with which offspring get two copies of a recessive deleterious alleles, lowering fitnesses via inbreeding depression. In a species that habitually inbreeds, e.g. through self-fertilization, a proportion of recessive deleterious alleles can be purged.

Likewise, in a small population of humans practicing endogamy, deleterious alleles can either overwhelm the population's gene pool, causing it to become extinct, or alternately, make it fitter.

=== Recombination/segregation ===
Combinations of alleles that have evolved to work well together may not work when recombined with a different suite of coevolved alleles, leading to outbreeding depression. Segregation load occurs in the presence of overdominance, i.e. when heterozygotes are more fit than either homozygote. In such a case, the heterozygous genotype gets broken down by Mendelian segregation, resulting in the production of homozygous offspring. Therefore, there is segregation load as not all individuals have the theoretical optimum genotype. Recombination load arises through unfavorable combinations across multiple loci that appear when favorable linkage disequilibria are broken down. Recombination load can also arise by combining deleterious alleles subject to synergistic epistasis, i.e. whose damage in combination is greater than that predicted from considering them in isolation. Evidence was reviewed indicating that meiosis reduces recombination load, thus providing a selective advantage of sexual reproduction.

Soft selection has also been proposed as a solution to high segregation load.

=== Migration ===
Migration load is hypothesized to occur when maladapted non-native organisms enter a new environment.

On one hand, beneficial genes from migrants can increase the fitness of local populations. On the other hand, migration may reduce the fitness of local populations by introducing maladaptive alleles. This is hypothesized to occur when the migration rate is "much greater" than the selection coefficient.

Migration load may occur by reducing the fitness of local organisms, or through natural selection imposed on the newcomers, such as by being eliminated by local predators. Most studies have only found evidence for this theory in the form of selection against immigrant populations, however, one study found evidence for increased mutational burden in recipient populations, as well.
