= Minimum viable population =

Smallest size a biological population can exist without facing extinction

Minimum viable population (MVP) is a lower bound on the population of a species, such that it can survive in the wild. This term is commonly used in the fields of biology, ecology, and conservation biology. MVP refers to the smallest possible size at which a biological population can exist without facing extinction from natural disasters or demographic, environmental, or genetic stochasticity. The term "population" is defined as a group of interbreeding individuals in similar geographic area that undergo negligible gene flow with other groups of the species. Typically, MVP is used to refer to a wild population, but can also be used for ex situ conservation (Zoo populations).

A graphical representation of population growth over total population. K is the carrying capacity, and MVP is minimum viable population.

== Estimation ==
There is no unique definition of what constitutes a sufficient population for the continuation of a species, because whether a species survives will depend to some extent on random events. Thus, any calculation of a minimum viable population (MVP) will depend on the population projection model used. A set of random (stochastic) projections might be used to estimate the initial population size needed (based on the assumptions in the model) for there to be, (for example) a 95% or 99% probability of survival 1,000 years into the future. Some models use generations as a unit of time rather than years in order to maintain consistency between taxa. These projections (population viability analyses, or PVA) use computer simulations to model populations using demographic and environmental information to project future population dynamics. The probability assigned to a PVA is arrived at after repeating the environmental simulation thousands of times.

== Extinction ==
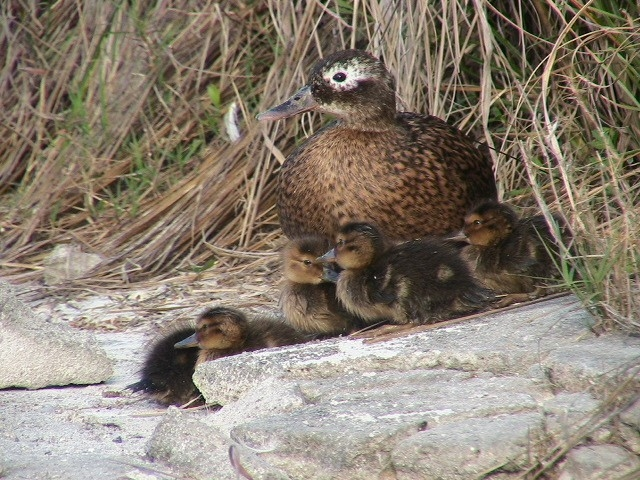
In 1912, the Laysan duck had an effective population size of seven adults at most.

Small populations are at a greater risk of extinction than larger populations due to small populations having less capacity to recover from adverse stochastic (i.e. random) events. Such events may be divided into four sources:

Demographic stochasticity
Demographic stochasticity is often only a driving force toward extinction in populations with fewer than 50 individuals. Random events influence the fecundity and survival of individuals in a population, and in larger populations, these events tend to stabilize toward a steady growth rate. However, in small populations there is much more relative variance, which can in turn cause extinction.
Environmental stochasticity
Small, random changes in the abiotic and biotic components of the ecosystem that a population inhabits fall under environmental stochasticity. Examples are changes in climate over time and the arrival of another species that competes for resources. Unlike demographic and genetic stochasticity, environmental stochasticity tends to affect populations of all sizes.
Natural catastrophes
An extension of environmental stochasticity, natural disasters are random, large scale events such as blizzards, droughts, storms, or fires that directly reduce a population within a short period of time. Natural catastrophes are the hardest events to predict, and MVP models often have difficulty factoring them in.
Genetic stochasticity
Small populations are vulnerable to genetic stochasticity, the random change in allele frequencies over time, also known as genetic drift. Genetic drift can cause alleles to disappear from a population, and this lowers genetic diversity. In small populations, low genetic diversity can increase rates of inbreeding, which can result in inbreeding depression, in which a population made up of genetically similar individuals loses fitness. Inbreeding in a population reduces fitness by causing deleterious recessive alleles to become more common in the population, and also by reducing adaptive potential. The so-called "50/500 rule", where a population needs 50 individuals to prevent inbreeding depression, and 500 individuals to guard against genetic drift at-large, is an oft-used benchmark for an MVP, but 2014 guidance indicates this rule is not applicable across a wide diversity of taxa.

== Application ==
MVP does not take external intervention into account. Thus, it is useful for conservation managers and environmentalists; a population may be increased above the MVP using a captive breeding program or by bringing other members of the species in from other reserves.

There is naturally some debate on the accuracy of PVAs, since a wide variety of assumptions are generally required for forecasting; however, the important consideration is not absolute accuracy but the promulgation of the concept that each species indeed has an MVP, which at least can be approximated for the sake of conservation biology and Biodiversity Action Plans.

There is a marked trend for insularity, surviving genetic bottlenecks, and r-strategy to allow far lower MVPs than average. Conversely, taxa easily affected by inbreeding depression –having high MVPs – are often decidedly K-strategists, with low population densities occurring over a wide range. An MVP of 500 to 1,000 has often been given as an average for terrestrial vertebrates when inbreeding or genetic variability is ignored. When inbreeding effects are included, estimates of MVP for many species are in the thousands. Based on a meta-analysis of reported values in the literature for many species, Traill et al. reported concerning vertebrates "a cross-species frequency distribution of MVP with a median of 4,169 individuals (95% CI = 3,577–5,129)."

== See also ==
- Effective population size
- Inbreeding depression
- Human population
- Metapopulation
- Rescue effect
