= Gene pool =

Set of all genes in a population

The gene pool is the set of all genes, or genetic information, in any population, usually of a particular species.

== Description ==
A large gene pool indicates extensive genetic diversity, which is associated with robust populations that can survive bouts of intense selection. Meanwhile, low genetic diversity (see inbreeding and population bottlenecks) can cause reduced biological fitness and an increased chance of extinction, although as explained by genetic drift new genetic variants, that may cause an increase in the fitness of organisms, are more likely to fix in the population if it is rather small.

When all individuals in a population are identical with regard to a particular phenotypic trait, the population is said to be 'monomorphic'. When the individuals show several variants of a particular trait they are said to be polymorphic.

== History ==
The Russian geneticist Alexander Sergeevich Serebrovsky first formulated the concept in the 1920s as genofond (gene fund), a term that was imported to the United States from the Soviet Union by Theodosius Dobzhansky, who translated it into English as "gene pool."

== Gene pool concept in crop breeding ==
Harlan and de Wet (1971) proposed classifying each crop and its related species by gene pools rather than by formal taxonomy.

1. Primary gene pool (GP-1): Members of this gene pool are probably in the same "species" (in conventional biological usage) and can intermate freely. Harlan and de Wet wrote, "Among forms of this gene pool, crossing is easy; hybrids are generally fertile with good chromosome pairing; gene segregation is approximately normal and gene transfer is generally easy.". They also advised subdividing each crop gene pool in two:
  - Subspecies A: Cultivated races
  - Subspecies B: Spontaneous races (wild or weedy)
2. Secondary gene pool (GP-2): Members of this pool are probably normally classified as different species than the crop species under consideration (the primary gene pool). However, these species are closely related and can cross and produce at least some fertile hybrids. As would be expected by members of different species, there are some reproductive barriers between members of the primary and secondary gene pools:
  - hybrids may be weak
  - hybrids may be partially sterile
  - chromosomes may pair poorly or not at all
  - recovery of desired phenotypes may be difficult in subsequent generations
  - However, "The gene pool is available to be utilized, however, if the plant breeder or geneticist is willing to put out the effort required."
3. Tertiary gene pool (GP-3): Members of this gene pool are more distantly related to the members of the primary gene pool. The primary and tertiary gene pools can be intermated, but gene transfer between them is impossible without the use of "rather extreme or radical measures" such as:
  - embryo rescue (or embryo culture, a form of plant organ culture)
  - induced polyploidy (chromosome doubling)
  - bridging crosses (e.g., with members of the secondary gene pool).

== Gene pool centres ==
Gene pool centres refer to areas on the earth where important crop plants and domestic animals originated. They have an extraordinary range of the wild counterparts of cultivated plant species and useful tropical plants. Gene pool centres also contain different sub tropical and temperate region species.

== See also ==
- Biodiversity
- Conservation biology
- Extinction vortex
- Founder effect
- Gene flow
- Genetic drift
- Small population size
- Australian Grains Genebank
