= Environmental stochasticity =

Population dynamics concept

Environmental stochasticity is a concept within population dynamics that describes random environmental events that result in variation of population size. The fluctuation of population sizes is a result of changes in mortality and reproduction rates of individuals in the population.

== Extinction ==
Environmental stochasticity results in fluctuating population sizes, which puts both small and large populations at increased risk of extinction, but smaller populations are naturally more vulnerable to extinction.

Environmental stochasticity cannot stop or change the trajectory of a population that is trending toward extinction; however, it can either exacerbate or lower the vulnerability of the population. This results in the acceleration or reduction of the rate of extinction depending on the intensity of stochasticity.

There is a negative correlation between population sizes and the intensity of environmental stochasticity when the population are under weak Allee effects (i.e. higher intensity of stochasticity leads to lower population size). This results in populations with high risk of extinction. On the other hand, for populations under strong Allee effects, the risk of extinction is dependent on the initial population size.

== Species richness ==
Environmental stochasticity has mechanisms that can increase or decrease the number of species within a community.

Random environmental events can lead to disruptions to the population or ecosystem that result in a destabilizing effect in which there is an increase in abundance fluctuation. This decreases species' resilience and increases the risk of extinction leading to a decrease in species richness.

On the other hand, the disruptions to the population or ecosystem can even out the mean fitness of different species. This neutralizing effect allows species that were formerly inferior to increase their population and decrease their extinction rate. The same environmental variation allows different adaptive responses from species through the storage effect. Both effects lead to an increase in species richness.

== Growth rate ==
The population growth rate with only environmental variation considered can be described with this equation:

$\lambda_t^{ES}={A_tn_t \over n_t}$

Where:

$\lambda_t^{ES}$= growth rate dependent on state of the environment

$A_t$= annual project matrices dependent on state of the environment

$n_t$=population number in the different ages or stages

In comparison to the basic population growth model:

$\lambda={N_{t+1} \over N}$

== Relation to demographic stochasticity ==
Unlike demographic stochasticity, the effects of environmental stochasticity is independent of population size. The environmental changes influence each individual through the same mechanism, resulting in the whole population being affected positively or negatively in the same way. Environmental stochasticity has a greater influence on the risk of extinction than demographic stochasticity when population are sufficiently large.

== Example ==
Environmental stochastic events can consist of modification to abiotic or biotic factors. Examples include but are not limited to changes in temperature, floods, droughts, heatwaves, soil erosion, disease, predation, and food availability.

For example, in environments where populations do not suffer from predation from large carnivores, populations of moose and red deer have a higher neonatal mortality rate in the summer than during the winter.

As another example, an increased variance in annual rainfall in combination with significant years of drought resulted in reduced viability of the population of Asiatic wild ass.
