= Extinction debt =

Future extinction of species due to events in the past

In ecology, extinction debt is the future extinction of species due to events in the past. The phrases dead clade walking and survival without recovery express the same idea.

Extinction debt occurs because of time delays between impacts on a species, such as destruction of habitat, and the species' ultimate disappearance. For instance, long-lived trees may survive for many years even after reproduction of new trees has become impossible, and thus they may be committed to extinction. Technically, extinction debt generally refers to the number of species in an area likely to become extinct, rather than the prospects of any one species, but colloquially it refers to any occurrence of delayed extinction.

Extinction debt may be local or global, but most examples are local as these are easier to observe and model. It is most likely to be found in long-lived species and species with very specific habitat requirements (specialists). Extinction debt has important implications for conservation, as it implies that species may become extinct due to past habitat destruction, even if continued impacts cease, and that current reserves may not be sufficient to maintain the species that occupy them. Interventions such as habitat restoration may reverse extinction debt.

Immigration credit is the corollary to extinction debt. It refers to the number of species likely to migrate to an area after an event such as the restoration of an ecosystem.

== Terminology ==
The term extinction debt was first used in 1994 in a paper by David Tilman, Robert May, Clarence Lehman and Martin Nowak, although Jared Diamond used the term "relaxation time" to describe a similar phenomenon in 1972.

Extinction debt is also known by the terms dead clade walking and survival without recovery when referring to the species affected. The phrase "dead clade walking" was coined by David Jablonski as early as 2001 as a reference to Dead Man Walking, a film whose title is based on American prison slang for a condemned prisoner's last walk to the execution chamber. "Dead clade walking" has since appeared in other scientists' writings about the aftermaths of mass extinctions.

In discussions of threats to biodiversity, extinction debt is analogous to the "climate commitment" in climate change, which states that inertia will cause the earth to continue to warm for centuries even if no more greenhouse gasses are emitted. Similarly, the current extinction may continue long after human impacts on species halt.

== Causes ==
Extinction debt is caused by many of the same drivers as extinction. The most well-known drivers of extinction debt are habitat fragmentation and habitat destruction. These cause extinction debt by reducing the ability of species to persist via immigration to new habitats. Under equilibrium conditions, a species may become extinct in one habitat patch yet continue to survive because it can disperse to other patches. However, as other patches have been destroyed or rendered inaccessible due to fragmentation, this "insurance" effect is reduced and the species may ultimately become extinct.

Pollution may also cause extinction debt by reducing a species' birth rate or increasing its death rate so that its population slowly declines. Extinction debts may also be caused by invasive species or by climate change.

Extinction debt may also occur due to the loss of mutualist species. In New Zealand, the local extinction of several species of pollinating birds in 1870 has caused a long-term reduction in the reproduction of the shrub species Rhabdothamnus solandri, which requires these birds to produce seeds. However, as the plant is slow-growing and long-lived, its populations persist.

Jablonski recognized at least four patterns in the fossil record following mass extinctions:

(1) survival without recovery
also called “dead clade walking” – a group dwindling to extinction or relegation to precarious, minor ecological niches
(2) continuity with setbacks
patterns disturbed by the extinction event but soon continuing on the previous trajectory
(3) unbroken continuity
large-scale patterns continuing with little disruption
(4) unbridled diversification
an increase in diversity and species richness, as in the mammals following the end-Cretaceous extinction event

== Rate of extinction ==
Jablonski found that the extinction rate of marine invertebrates was significantly higher in the stage (major subdivision of an epoch – typically 2–10 million years' duration) following a mass extinction than in the stages preceding the mass extinction. His analysis focused on marine molluscs since they constitute the most abundant group of fossils and are therefore the least likely to produce sampling errors. Jablonski suggested that two possible explanations deserved further study:

- Post-extinction physical environments differed from pre-extinction environments in ways which were disadvantageous to the "dead clades walking".
- Ecosystems that developed after recoveries from mass extinctions may have been less favorable for the "dead clades walking".

== Time scale ==
The time to "payoff" of extinction debt can be very long. Islands that lost habitat at the end of the last ice age 10,000 years ago still appear to be losing species as a result. It has been shown that some bryozoans, a type of microscopic marine organism, became extinct due to the volcanic rise of the Isthmus of Panama. This event cut off the flow of nutrients from the Pacific Ocean to the Caribbean 3–4.5 million years ago. While bryozoan populations dropped severely at this time, extinction of these species took another 1–2 million years.

Extinction debts incurred due to human actions have shorter timescales. Local extinction of birds from rainforest fragmentation occurs over years or decades, while plants in fragmented grasslands show debts lasting 50–100 years. Tree species in fragmented temperate forests have debts lasting 200 years or more.

== Theoretical development ==
=== Origins in metapopulation models ===
Tilman et al. demonstrated that extinction debt could occur using a mathematical ecosystem model of species metapopulations. Metapopulations are multiple populations of a species that live in separate habitat patches or islands but interact via immigration between the patches. In this model, species persist via a balance between random local extinctions in patches and colonization of new patches. Tilman et al. used this model to predict that species would persist long after they no longer had sufficient habitat to support them. When used to estimate extinction debts of tropical tree species, the model predicted debts lasting 50–400 years.

One of the assumptions underlying the original extinction debt model was a trade-off between species' competitive ability and colonization ability. That is, a species that competes well against other species, and is more likely to become dominant in an area, is less likely to colonize new habitats due to evolutionary trade-offs. One of the implications of this assumption is that better competitors, which may even be more common than other species, are more likely to become extinct than rarer, less competitive, better dispersing species. This has been one of the more controversial components of the model, as there is little evidence for this trade-off in many ecosystems, and in many empirical studies dominant competitors were least likely species to become extinct. A later modification of the model showed that these trade-off assumptions may be relaxed, but need to exist partially, in order for the theory to work.

=== Development in other models ===
Further theoretical work has shown that extinction debt can occur under many different circumstances, driven by different mechanisms and under different model assumptions. The original model predicted extinction debt as a result of habitat destruction in a system of small, isolated habitats such as islands. Later models showed that extinction debt could occur in systems where habitat destruction occurs in small areas within a large area of habitat, as in slash-and-burn agriculture in forests, and could also occur due to decreased growth of species from pollutants. Predicted patterns of extinction debt differ between models, though. For instance, habitat destruction resembling slash-and-burn agriculture is thought to affect rare species rather than poor colonizers. Models that incorporate stochasticity, or random fluctuation in populations, show extinction debt occurring over different time scales than classic models.

Most recently, extinction debts have been estimated through the use models derived from neutral theory. Neutral theory has very different assumptions than the metapopulation models described above. It predicts that the abundance and distribution of species can be predicted entirely through random processes, without considering the traits of individual species. As extinction debt arises in models under such different assumptions, it is robust to different kinds of models. Models derived from neutral theory have successfully predicted extinction times for a number of bird species, but perform poorly at both very small and very large spatial scales.

Mathematical models have also shown that extinction debt will last longer if it occurs in response to large habitat impacts (as the system will move farther from equilibrium), and if species are long-lived. Also, species just below their extinction threshold, that is, just below the population level or habitat occupancy levels required sustain their population, will have long-term extinction debts. Finally, extinction debts are predicted to last longer in landscapes with a few large patches of habitat, rather than many small ones.

== Detection ==
Extinction debt is difficult to detect and measure. Processes that drive extinction debt are inherently slow and highly variable (noisy), and it is difficult to locate or count the very small populations of near-extinct species. Because of these issues, most measures of extinction debt have a great deal of uncertainty.

=== Experimental evidence ===
Due to the logistical and ethical difficulties of inciting extinction debt, there are few studies of extinction debt in controlled experiments. However, experiments microcosms of insects living on moss habitats demonstrated that extinction debt occurs after habitat destruction. In these experiments, it took 6–12 months for species to die out following the destruction of habitat.

=== Observational methods ===
==== Long-term observation ====
Extinction debts that reach equilibrium in relatively short time scales (years to decades) can be observed via measuring the change in species numbers in the time following an impact on habitat. For instance, in the Amazon rainforest, researchers have measured the rate at which bird species disappear after forest is cut down. As even short-term extinction debts can take years to decades to reach equilibrium, though, such studies take many years and good data are rare.

==== Comparing the past and present ====
Most studies of extinction debt compare species numbers with habitat patterns from the past and habitat patterns in the present. If the present populations of species are more closely related to past habitat patterns than present, extinction debt is a likely explanation. The magnitude of extinction debt (i.e., number of species likely to become extinct) can not be estimated by this method.

If one has information on species populations from the past in addition to the present, the magnitude of extinction debt can be estimated. One can use the relationship between species and habitat from the past to predict the number of species expected in the present. The difference between this estimate and the actual number of species is the extinction debt.

This method requires the assumption that in the past species and their habitat were in equilibrium, which is often unknown. Also, a common relationship used to equate habitat and species number is the species-area curve, but as the species-area curve arises from very different mechanisms than those in metapopulation based models, extinction debts measured in this way may not conform with metapopulation models' predictions. The relationship between habitat and species number can also be represented by much more complex models that simulate the behavior of many species independently.

==== Comparing impacted and pristine habitats ====
If data on past species numbers or habitat are not available, species debt can also be estimated by comparing two different habitats: one which is mostly intact, and another which has had areas cleared and is smaller and more fragmented. One can then measure the relationship of species with the condition of habitat in the intact habitat, and, assuming this represents equilibrium, use it to predict the number of species in the cleared habitat. If this prediction is lower than the actual number of species in the cleared habitat, then the difference represents extinction debt. This method requires many of the same assumptions as methods comparing the past and present.

=== Examples ===
==== Grasslands ====
Studies of European grasslands show evidence of extinction debt through both comparisons with the past and between present-day systems with different levels of human impacts. The species diversity of grasslands in Sweden appears to be a remnant of more connected landscapes present 50 to 100 years ago. In alvar grasslands in Estonia that have lost area since the 1930s, 17–70% of species are estimated to be committed to extinction. However, studies of similar grasslands in Belgium, where similar impacts have occurred, show no evidence of extinction debt. This may be due to differences in the scale of measurement or the level of specialization of grass species.

==== Forests ====
Forests in Flemish Brabant, Belgium, show evidence of extinction debt remaining from deforestation that occurred between 1775 and 1900. Detailed modeling of species behavior, based on similar forests in England that did not experience deforestation, showed that long-lived and slow-growing species were more common than equilibrium models would predict, indicating that their presence was due to lingering extinction debt.

In Sweden, some species of lichens show an extinction debt in fragments of ancient forest. However, species of lichens that are habitat generalists, rather than specialists, do not.

==== Insects ====
Extinction debt has been found among species of butterflies living in the grasslands on Saaremaa and Muhu – islands off the western coast of Estonia. Butterfly species distributions on these islands are better explained by the habitat in the past than current habitats.

On the islands of the Azores Archipelago, more than 95% of native forests have been destroyed in the past 600 years. As a result, more than half of arthropods on these islands are believed to be committed to extinction, with many islands likely to lose more than 90% of species.

==== Vertebrates ====
Of extinction from past deforestation in the Amazon, 80–90% has yet to occur, based on modeling based on species-area relationships. Local extinctions of approximately 6 species are expected in each 2500 km^{2} region by 2050 due to past deforestation. Birds in the Amazon rainforest continued to become extinct locally for 12 years following logging that broke up contiguous forest into smaller fragments. The extinction rate slowed, however, as forest regrew in the spaces in between habitat fragments.

Countries in Africa are estimated to have, on average, a local extinction debt of 30% for forest-dwelling primates. That is, they are expected to have 30% of their forest primate species to become extinct in the future due to loss of forest habitat. The time scale for these extinctions has not been estimated.

Based on historical species-area relationships, Hungary currently has approximately nine more species of raptors than are thought to be able to be supported by current nature reserves.

== Applications to conservation ==
The existence of extinction debt in many different ecosystems has important implications for conservation. It implies that in the absence of further habitat destruction or other environmental impacts, many species are still likely to become extinct. Protection of existing habitats may not be sufficient to protect species from extinction. However, the long time scales of extinction debt may allow for habitat restoration in order to prevent extinction, as occurred in the slowing of extinction in Amazon forest birds above. The concept has also been applied to lichens, with delayed local disappearances reported after earlier habitat loss or degradation. In another example, it has been found that grizzly bears in very small reserves in the Rocky Mountains are likely to become extinct, but this finding allows the modification of reserve networks to better support their populations.

The extinction debt concept may require revision of the value of land for species conservation, as the number of species currently present in a habitat may not be a good measure of the habitat's ability to support species (see carrying capacity) in the future. As extinction debt may last longest near extinction thresholds, it may be hardest to detect the threat of extinction for species that conservation could benefit the most.

Economic analyses have shown that including extinction in management decision-making process changes decision outcomes, as the decision to destroy habitat changes conservation value in the future as well as the present. It is estimated that in Costa Rica, ongoing extinction debt may cost between $88 million and $467 million.

== In popular culture ==
- An episode of the CBS series Elementary was named "Dead Clade Walking".
