= Population viability analysis =

Ecological measurement of extinction risk

Population viability analysis (PVA) is a species-specific method of risk assessment frequently used in conservation biology. It is traditionally defined as the process that determines the probability that a population will go extinct within a given number of years. More recently, PVA has been described as a marriage of ecology and statistics that brings together species characteristics and environmental variability to forecast population health and extinction risk. Each PVA is individually developed for a target population or species, and consequently, each PVA is unique. The larger goal in mind when conducting a PVA is to ensure that the population of a species is self-sustaining over the long term.

== Uses ==
Population viability analysis (PVA) is used to estimate the likelihood of a population's extinction and indicate the urgency of recovery efforts, and identify key life stages or processes that should be the focus of recovery efforts. PVA is also used to identify factors that drive population dynamics, compare proposed management options and assess existing recovery efforts. PVA is frequently used in endangered species management to develop a plan of action, rank the pros and cons of different management scenarios, and assess the potential impacts of habitat loss.

== History ==
In the 1970s, Yellowstone National Park was the centre of a heated debate over different proposals to manage the park's problem grizzly bears (Ursus arctos). In 1978, Mark Shaffer proposed a model for the grizzlies that incorporated random variability, and calculated extinction probabilities and minimum viable population size. The first PVA is credited to Shaffer.

PVA gained popularity in the United States as federal agencies and ecologists required methods to evaluate the risk of extinction and possible outcomes of management decisions, particularly in accordance with the Endangered Species Act of 1973, and the National Forest Management Act of 1976.

In 1986, Gilpin and Soulé broadened the PVA definition to include the interactive forces that affect the viability of a population, including genetics. The use of PVA increased dramatically in the late 1980s and early 1990s following advances in personal computers and software packages.

== Examples ==
The endangered Fender's blue butterfly (Icaricia icarioides) was recently assessed with a goal of providing additional information to the United States Fish and Wildlife Service, which was developing a recovery plan for the species. The PVA concluded that the species was more at risk of extinction than previously thought and identified key sites where recovery efforts should be focused. The PVA also indicated that because the butterfly populations fluctuate widely from year to year, to prevent the populations from going extinct the minimum annual population growth rate must be kept much higher than at levels typically considered acceptable for other species.

Following a recent outbreak of canine distemper virus, a PVA was performed for the critically endangered island fox (Urocyon littoralis) of Santa Catalina Island, California. The Santa Catalina island fox population is uniquely composed of two subpopulations that are separated by an isthmus, with the eastern subpopulation at greater risk of extinction than the western subpopulation. PVA was conducted with the goals of 1) evaluating the island fox's extinction risk, 2) estimating the island fox's sensitivity to catastrophic events, and 3) evaluating recent recovery efforts which include release of captive-bred foxes and transport of wild juvenile foxes from the west to the east side. Results of the PVA concluded that the island fox is still at significant risk of extinction, and is highly susceptible to catastrophes that occur more than once every 20 years. Furthermore, extinction risks and future population sizes on both sides of the island were significantly dependent on the number of foxes released and transported each year.

PVAs in combination with sensitivity analysis can also be used to identify which vital rates has the relative greatest effect on population growth and other measures of population viability. For example, a study by Manlik et al. (2016) forecast the viability of two bottlenose dolphin populations in Western Australia and identified reproduction as having the greatest influence on the forecast of these populations. One of the two populations was forecast to be stable, whereas the other population was forecast to decline, if it isolated from other populations and low reproductive rates persist. The difference in viability between the two studies was primarily due to differences in reproduction and not survival. The study also showed that temporal variation in reproduction had a greater effect on population growth than temporal variation in survival.

== Controversy ==
Debates exist and remain unresolved over the appropriate uses of PVA in conservation biology and PVA's ability to accurately assess extinction risks.

A large quantity of field data is desirable for PVA; some conservatively estimate that for a precise extinction probability assessment extending T years into the future, five-to-ten times T years of data are needed. Datasets of such magnitude are typically unavailable for rare species; it has been estimated that suitable data for PVA is available for only 2% of threatened bird species. PVA for threatened and endangered species is particularly a problem as the predictive power of PVA plummets dramatically with minimal datasets. Ellner et al. (2002) argued that PVA has little value in such circumstances and is best replaced by other methods. Others argue that PVA remains the best tool available for estimations of extinction risk, especially with the use of sensitivity model runs.

Even with an adequate dataset, it is possible that a PVA can still have large errors in extinction rate predictions. It is impossible to incorporate all future possibilities into a PVA: habitats may change, catastrophes may occur, new diseases may be introduced. PVA utility can be enhanced by multiple model runs with varying sets of assumptions including the forecasted future date. Some prefer to use PVA always in a relative analysis of benefits of alternative management schemes, such as comparing proposed resource management plans.

Accuracy of PVAs has been tested in a few retrospective studies. For example, a study comparing PVA model forecasts with the actual fate of 21 well-studied taxa, showed that growth rate projections are accurate, if input variables are based on sound data, but highlighted the importance of understanding density-dependence (Brook et al. 2000). Also, McCarthey et al. (2003) showed that PVA predictions are relatively accurate, when they are based on long-term data. Still, the usefulness of PVA lies more in its capacity to identify and assess potential threats, than in making long-term, categorical predictions (Akçakaya & Sjögren-Gulve 2000).

== Future directions ==
Improvements to PVA likely to occur in the near future include: 1) creating a fixed definition of PVA and scientific standards of quality by which all PVA are judged and 2) incorporating recent genetic advances into PVA.

== See also ==
- Biodiversity
- Endangered Species Act
- IUCN Red List
- Minimum viable population
- Population dynamics
- Population genetics
