= Founder effect =

Loss of genetic variation in a new population

Founder effect: The original population (left) could give rise to different founder populations (right).

In population genetics, the founder effect is the loss of genetic variation that occurs when a new population is established by a very small number of individuals from a larger population. It was first fully outlined by Ernst Mayr in 1942, using existing theoretical work by those such as Sewall Wright. As a result of the loss of genetic variation, the new population may be distinctively different, both genotypically and phenotypically, from the parent population from which it is derived. In extreme cases, the founder effect is thought to lead to the speciation and subsequent evolution of new species.

In the figure shown, the original population has nearly equal numbers of blue and red individuals. The three smaller founder populations show that one or the other color may predominate (founder effect), due to random sampling of the original population. A population bottleneck may also cause a founder effect, though it is not strictly a new population.

The founder effect occurs when a small group of migrants—not genetically representative of the population from which they came—establish in a new area. In addition to founder effects, the new population is often very small, so it shows increased sensitivity to genetic drift, an increase in inbreeding, and relatively low genetic variation.

== Founder mutation ==
In genetics, a founder mutation is a mutation that appears in the DNA of one or more individuals which are founders of a distinct population. Founder mutations initiate with changes that occur in the DNA and can be passed down to other generations. Any organism—from a simple virus to something complex like a mammal—whose progeny carry its mutation has the potential to express the founder effect, for instance a goat or a human.

Founder mutations originate in long stretches of DNA on a single chromosome; indeed, the original haplotype is the whole chromosome. As the generations progress, the proportion of the haplotype that is common to all carriers of the mutation is shortened (due to genetic recombination). This shortening allows scientists to roughly estimate the age of the mutation.

== General ==
The founder effect is a type of genetic drift, occurring when a small group in a population splinters off from the original population and forms a new one. The new colony may have less genetic variation than the original population, and through the random sampling of alleles during reproduction of subsequent generations, continue rapidly towards fixation. The homozygosity increase can be calculated as $\Delta{f}=1/2N$, where $f$ equals inbreeding coefficient and $N$ equals population size. This consequence of inbreeding makes the colony more vulnerable to extinction.

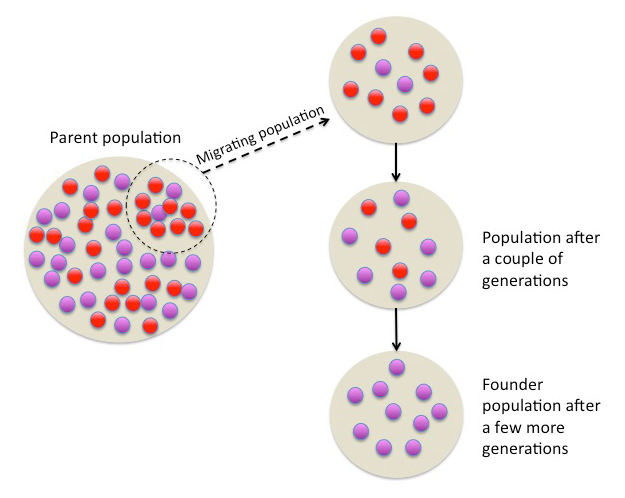
The small founding population experiences a loss of heterozygosity after multiple generations. ("Genetic Drift" by Boundless, 2015.)

The per generation loss of heterozygosity can be calculated as $\Delta{h} = -1/2N$, where $h$ equals heterozygosity. The population of the founders of the colony can also be calculated if the loss of heterozygosity from the bottleneck is known using the same equation.

When a newly formed colony is small, its founders can strongly affect the population's genetic makeup far into the future. In humans, who have a slow reproduction rate, the population will remain small for many generations, effectively amplifying the drift effect generation after generation until the population reaches a certain size. The post-bottleneck population can be calculated with $N(t)={K \over 1+be^{-rt}}$, where $t$ equals the number of generations, $r$ is the growth rate, $K$ is the population equilibrium size, $e$ is the natural logarithm base, and $b$ is the constant $(K-N_0)/N_0$, where $N_0$ is the original size of the founding colony.

Alleles which were present but relatively rare in the original population can move to one of two extremes. The most common one is that the allele is soon lost altogether, but the other possibility is that the allele survives and within a few generations has become much more dispersed throughout the population. The new colony can experience an increase in the frequency of recessive alleles, as well, and as a result, an increased number who are homozygous for certain recessive traits. The equation to calculate reccessive allele frequencies is $\hat{q}=\surd N_{22}/N$ based on Hardy-Wienberg assumptions.

The variation in gene frequency between the original population and colony may also trigger the two groups to diverge significantly over the course of many generations. As the variance, or genetic distance, increases, the two separated populations may become distinctively different, both genetically and phenotypically, although not only genetic drift, but also natural selection, gene flow and mutation all contribute to this divergence. This potential for relatively rapid changes in the colony's gene frequency led most scientists to consider the founder effect (and by extension, genetic drift) a significant driving force in the evolution of new species. Sewall Wright was the first to attach this significance to random drift and small, newly isolated populations with his shifting balance theory of speciation. Following behind Wright, Ernst Mayr created many persuasive models to show that the decline in genetic variation and small population size accompanying the founder effect were critically important for new species to develop. However, much less support for this view is shown today, since the hypothesis has been tested repeatedly through experimental research, and the results have been equivocal at best. Speciation by genetic drift is a specific case of peripatric speciation which in itself occurs in rare instances. It takes place when a random change in genetic frequency of population favours the survival of a few organisms of the species with rare genes which cause reproductive mutation. These surviving organisms then breed among themselves over a long period of time to create a whole new species whose reproductive systems or behaviors are no longer compatible with the original population.

== Serial founder effect ==
Serial founder effects have occurred when populations migrate over long distances. Such long-distance migrations typically involve relatively rapid movements followed by periods of settlement. The populations in each migration carry only a subset of the genetic diversity carried from previous migrations. As a result, genetic differentiation tends to increase with geographic distance as described by the "isolation by distance" model. The migration of humans out of Africa is characterized by serial founder effects. Africa has the highest degree of human genetic diversity of any continent, which is consistent with an African origin of modern humans.

== In island ecology ==
Founder populations are essential to the study of island biogeography and island ecology. A natural "blank slate" is not easily found, but a classic series of studies on founder population effects was done following the catastrophic 1883 eruption of Krakatoa, which erased all life on the island. Another continuing study has been following the biocolonization of Surtsey, Iceland, a new volcanic island that erupted offshore between 1963 and 1967. An earlier event, the Toba eruption in Sumatra about 73,000 years ago, covered some parts of India with 3–6 m (10–20 ft) of ash, and must have coated the Nicobar Islands and Andaman Islands, much nearer in the ash fallout cone, with life-smothering layers, forcing the restart of their biodiversity.

However, not all founder effect studies are initiated after a natural disaster; some scientists study the reinstatement of a species that became locally extinct or hadn't existed there before. A study has been in place since 1958 studying the wolf/moose interaction on Isle Royale in Lake Superior after those animals naturally migrated there, perhaps on winter ice. Hajji and others, and Hundertmark & Van Daele, studied the current population statuses of past founder effects in Corsican red deer and Alaskan elk, respectively. Corsican red deer are still listed as an endangered species, decades after a severe bottleneck. They inhabit the Tyrrhenian islands and surrounding mainlands currently, and before the bottleneck, but Hajji and others wanted to know how the deer originally got to the islands, and from what parent population or species they were derived. Through molecular analysis, they were able to determine a possible lineage, with red deer from the islands of Corsica and Sardinia being the most related to one another. These results are promising, as the island of Corsica was repopulated with red deer from the Sardinian island after the original Corsican red deer population became extinct, and the deer now inhabiting the island of Corsica are diverging from those inhabiting Sardinia.

Kolbe and others set up a pair of genetically sequenced and morphologically examined lizards on seven small islands to watch each new population's growth and adaptation to its new environment. Specifically, they were looking at the effects on limb length and perch width, both widely varying phenotypic ranges in the parent population. Unfortunately, immigration did occur, but the founder effect and adaptive differentiation, which could eventually lead to peripatric speciation, were statistically and biologically significant between the island populations after a few years. The authors also point out that although adaptive differentiation is significant, the differences between island populations best reflect the differences between founders and their genetic diversity that has been passed down through the generations.

Founder effects can affect complex traits, such as song diversity. In the common myna (Acridotheres tristis), the percentage of unique songs within a repertoire and within‐song complexity were significantly lower in birds from founder populations.

It was found by Tarr et al. (1998) that the loss of heterozygosity of the Laysan finch (Telespiza cantans) after founding events on small islands in the Pacific Ocean closely matched theoretical calculations upon examination of microsatellite loci.

== Among human populations ==
Genetic studies of founder effect have concentrated on discovering ancestral and novel genetic diseases caused by founder effect and, to a lesser degree, on ancestry-related founder effects on populations, races, and ancient migrations, as well as other aspects. The founder population could be the common ancestry of race or ethnicity or the forced localizations caused by artificial countries inside the larger group of ancestry, hence causing an original founder effect. Race and specific founder effect mutation diseases are found in all races or ethnicities, and country-specific mutation diseases are caused by increasing homozygosity (the existence of same gene on both chromosomes pairs, hence a recessive disease may increase in just few generations). The genetic abnormality will increase incrementally with the decrease of number of isolated populations making tribe-specific diseases (such as Ashkenazi Jews, Amish, and Bedouins) and novel genetic defects. In recessive diseases, founder populations where underlying levels of genome-wide homozygosity are high due to shared common ancestry, but also for consanguineous populations that will have large genome-wide homozygous regions due to inbreeding. Having a catalog of disease-associated variation in these populations enables rapid, early, and accurate diagnoses that may improve patient outcomes due to informed clinical management and early interventions. Enclosed communities such as Amish communities, Ashkenazi communities, and relatively isolated islands allow scientists to better understand and further discover the mutated genes that cause these rare diseases and allow them to also discover protective genes as well.

Due to various migrations throughout human history, founder effects are somewhat common among humans in different times and places. The French Canadians of Quebec are a classical example of founder population. Over 150 years of French colonization, between 1608 and 1760, an estimated 8,500 pioneers married and left at least one descendant on the territory. Following the takeover of the colony by the British crown in 1760, immigration from France effectively stopped, but descendants of French settlers continued to grow in number mainly due to their high fertility rate. Intermarriage occurred mostly with the deported Acadians and migrants coming from the British Isles. Since the 20th century, immigration in Quebec and mixing of French Canadians involve people from all over the world. While the French Canadians of Quebec today may be partly of other ancestries, the genetic contribution of the original French founders is predominant, explaining about 90% of regional gene pools, while Acadian (descended from other French settlers in eastern Canada) admixtures contributing 4% British and 2% Native American and other groups contributing less. The founder effect can also be observed among some communities of the Romani people, an Indo-Aryan ethnic group, which numbers approximately 8-10 million people in Europe, and additional numbers in other parts of the world, such as the United States and Latin America, and who were traditionally a nomadic population.

In humans, founder effects can arise from cultural isolation, and inevitably, endogamy. For example, the Amish populations in the United States exhibit founder effects because they have grown from a very few founders, have not recruited newcomers, and tend to marry within the community. Though still rare, phenomena such as polydactyly (extra fingers and toes, a symptom of a condition such as Weyers acrodental dysostosis or Ellis–Van Creveld syndrome) are more common in Amish communities than in the American population at large. Maple syrup urine disease affects about one out of 180,000 infants in the general population. Due in part to the founder effect, however, the disease has a much higher prevalence in children of Amish, Mennonite, and Jewish descent. Similarly, a high frequency of fumarase deficiency exists among the 10,000 members of the Fundamentalist Church of Jesus Christ of Latter Day Saints, a community which practices both endogamy and polygyny, where an estimated 75–80% of the community are blood relatives of just two men—founders John Y. Barlow and Joseph Smith Jessop. In South Asia, castes like the Gujjars, the Baniyas and the Pattapu Kapu have estimated founder effects about 10 times as strong as those of Finns and Ashkenazi Jews.

In Africa, many members of the Vadoma tribe inherit ectrodactyly, giving them the nickname of the "two-toed tribe".

The island of Pingelap also suffered a population bottleneck in 1775 following a typhoon that had reduced the population to only 20 people. As a result, complete achromatopsia has a current rate of occurrence of roughly 10%, with an additional 30% being carriers of this recessive condition.

Around 1814, a small group of British colonists founded a settlement on Tristan da Cunha, a group of small islands in the Atlantic Ocean, midway between Africa and South America. One of the early colonists apparently carried a rare, recessive allele for retinitis pigmentosa, a progressive form of blindness that afflicts homozygous individuals. As late as 1961, the majority of the genes in the gene pool on Tristan were still derived from 15 original ancestors; as a consequence of the inbreeding, of 232 people tested in 1961, four were suffering from retinitis pigmentosa. This represents a prevalence of 1 in 58, compared with a worldwide prevalence of around 1 in 4,000.

The abnormally high rate of twin births in Cândido Godói could be explained by the founder effect.

On 31 August 2023, researchers reported, based on genetic studies, that a human ancestor population bottleneck (from a possible 100,000 to 1000 individuals) occurred "around 930,000 and 813,000 years ago ... lasted for about 117,000 years and brought human ancestors close to extinction."

== See also ==
- Cousin marriage
- Founder takes all
- Genetic bottleneck
- Genetic drift
- Inbreeding depression
- Mitochondrial Eve
- Neolithic founder crops
- Persister cells
- Popular sire effect
- Small population size
