= Extinction vortex =

Class of models about the dynamics of extinctions of species

Extinction vortices are types of extinction causing the population dynamics to "spiral" in a feedback loop, i.e., for small populations to become increasingly vulnerable as they reduce in size. M. E. Gilpin and M. E. Soulé distinguished between four classes of extinction vortices. The first two (R and D) deal with environmental factors that have an effect on the ecosystem or community level, such as disturbance, pollution, habitat loss etc. The second two (F and A) deal with genetic factors such as inbreeding depression and outbreeding depression, genetic drift etc. This concept helps conservation biologists, geneticists and ecologists to understand extinction events.

== Types of vortices ==
Some vortices act rapidly, while others involve slower events on the timescale of the fixation of mutations.

=== Short-term vortices ===
- R Vortex: The R vortex is initiated when there is a disturbance which facilitates a lowering of population size (N) and a corresponding increase in variability (Var(r)), representing standing genetic variation. This event can make populations vulnerable to additional disturbances which will lead to further decreases in population size (N) and further increases in variability (Var(r)). A prime example of this would be the disruption of sex ratios in a population away from the species optimum.
- D Vortex: The D vortex is initiated when population size (N) decreases and the population becomes "patchy" or fragmented. Within these fragments, local extinction rates increase which, further exacerbates the problem of patchiness.
- F Vortex: The F vortex is initiated by a decrease in population size (N) which leads to a decrease in heterozygosity, creating inbreeding depression and thus lowering a population's fitness, which causes a further decrease in N.

=== Long-term vortices ===
- A Vortex: The A vortex describes longer term inabilities to prevent deleterious mutations from fixing, and to discover new adaptive mutations. The first is known as "mutational meltdown", and the second as "mutational drought", with the latter generally more important.

== Extinction vortex factors ==
=== Environmental factors ===
Many of the environmental events that contribute to an extinction vortex do so through reduction in population size. These events can include rapid loss of population size due to disease, natural disasters, and climate change. Habitat loss and/or habitat degradation can also kick start an extinction vortex. Other factors include events that occur more gradually, such over-harvesting (hunting, fishing, etc.), or excessive predation.

=== Genetic factors ===
Populations that succumb to an extinction vortex experience strong genetic factors that cause already small populations to decrease in size over time. Inbreeding within a small population tends to cause inbreeding depression, and this can cause fewer offspring, more birth defects, more individuals prone to disease, decreased survival and reproduction (fitness). Genetic drift can also caused decreased genetic diversity within the population from which adaptation needs to occur.

Another genetic factor that can lead small populations toward the spiral of extinction is limited gene flow. For example, if a population becomes isolated due to habitat fragmentation, migration rates decrease or become non-existent, causing the population to lose genetic diversity over time and increasing inbreeding. Migration is important because new individuals from outside of the population will almost certainly add new genetic variation, which can increase overall fitness within the population.

One example of the role of genetics in extinction occurs in the case of fragmented metapopulations of southern dunlins (Calidris alpine schinzii) in SW Sweden. These endangered shorebirds experienced inbreeding and loss of genetic diversity at two molecular markers examined, and this limited survival and reproduction throughout the population by increasing inbreeding. When parent dunlins with more similar genetics mated, their offspring had lower likelihood of hatching, and if they did manage to hatch, they were more likely to die soon after hatching.

=== Demographic factors ===
Demographic factors that are involved in extinction vortices include reduced fecundity, changes in dispersal patterns, and decreased population density.

== See also ==
- Error catastrophe
- Error threshold
- Muller's ratchet
- Mutational meltdown
- Population dynamics
- Small population size
