= Muller's ratchet =

Accumulation of harmful mutations

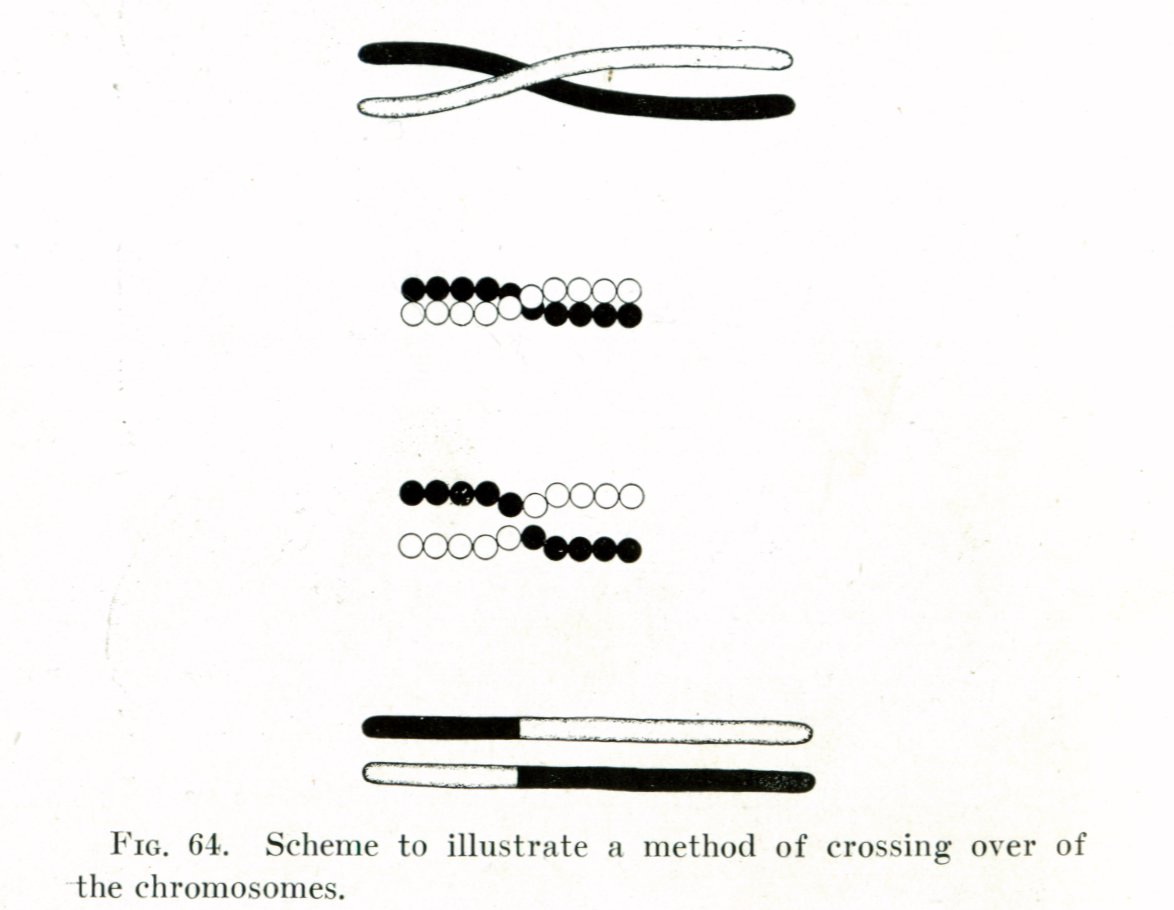
Illustration of chromosome crossover during genetic recombination

In evolutionary genetics, Muller's ratchet (named after American geneticist Hermann Joseph Muller, by analogy with a ratchet effect) is a process which, in the absence of recombination (especially in an asexual population), results in an accumulation of irreversible deleterious mutations. That happens because in the absence of recombination, and assuming reverse mutations are rare, offspring bear at least as much mutational load as their parents.

Muller proposed the mechanism as one reason why sexual reproduction may be favored over asexual reproduction, as sexual organisms benefit from recombination and consequent elimination of deleterious mutations. The negative effect of accumulating irreversible deleterious mutations may not be prevalent in organisms which, while they reproduce asexually, also undergo other forms of recombination. This effect has also been observed in those regions of the genomes of sexual organisms that do not undergo recombination.

== Etymology ==
Although Muller discussed the advantages of sexual reproduction in his 1932 talk, it does not contain the word "ratchet". Muller first introduced the term "ratchet" in his 1964 paper, and the phrase "Muller's ratchet" was coined by Joe Felsenstein in his 1974 paper, "The Evolutionary Advantage of Recombination".

== Explanation ==
Asexual reproduction compels genomes to be inherited as indivisible blocks so that once the least mutated genomes in an asexual population begin to carry at least one deleterious mutation, no genomes with fewer such mutations can be expected to be found in future generations (except as a result of back mutation). This results in an eventual accumulation of mutations known as genetic load. In theory, the genetic load carried by asexual populations eventually becomes so great that the population goes extinct. Also, laboratory experiments have confirmed the existence of the ratchet and the consequent extinction of populations in many organisms (under intense drift and when recombinations are not allowed) including RNA viruses, bacteria, and eukaryotes. In sexual populations, the process of genetic recombination allows the genomes of the offspring to be different from the genomes of the parents. In particular, progeny (offspring) genomes with fewer mutations can be generated from more highly mutated parental genomes by putting together mutation-free portions of parental chromosomes. Also, purifying selection, to some extent, unburdens a loaded population when recombination results in different combinations of mutations.

Among protists and prokaryotes, a plethora of supposedly asexual organisms exists. More and more are being shown to exchange genetic information through a variety of mechanisms. In contrast, the genomes of mitochondria and chloroplasts do not recombine and would undergo Muller's ratchet were they not as small as they are (see Birdsell and Wills [pp. 93–95]). Indeed, the probability that the least mutated genomes in an asexual population end up carrying at least one (additional) mutation depends heavily on the genomic mutation rate and this increases more or less linearly with the size of the genome (more accurately, with the number of base pairs present in active genes). However, reductions in genome size, especially in parasites and symbionts, can also be caused by direct selection to get rid of genes that have become unnecessary. Therefore, a smaller genome is not a sure indication of the action of Muller's ratchet.

In sexually reproducing organisms, nonrecombining chromosomes or chromosomal regions such as the mammalian Y chromosome (with the exception of multicopy sequences which do engage intrachromosomal recombination and gene conversion) should also be subject to the effects of Muller's ratchet. Such nonrecombining sequences tend to shrink and evolve quickly. However, this fast evolution might also be due to these sequences' inability to repair DNA damage via template-assisted repair, which is equivalent to an increase in the mutation rate for these sequences. Ascribing cases of genome shrinkage or fast evolution to Muller's ratchet alone is not easy.

Muller's ratchet relies on genetic drift, and turns faster in smaller populations because in such populations deleterious mutations have a better chance of fixation. Therefore, it sets the limits to the maximum size of asexual genomes and to the long-term evolutionary continuity of asexual lineages. However, some asexual lineages are thought to be quite ancient; Bdelloid rotifers, for example, appear to have been asexual for nearly 40 million years. However, rotifers were found to possess a substantial number of foreign genes from possible horizontal gene transfer events. Furthermore, a vertebrate fish, Poecilia formosa, seems to defy the ratchet effect, having existed for 500,000 generations. This has been explained by maintenance of genomic diversity through parental introgression and a high level of heterozygosity resulting from the hybrid origin of this species.

== Calculation of the fittest class ==
In 1978, John Haigh used a Wright–Fisher model to analyze the effect of Muller's ratchet in an asexual population. If the ratchet is operating the fittest class (least loaded individuals) is small and prone to extinction by the effect of genetic drift. In his paper Haigh derives the equation that calculates the frequency of individuals carrying $k$ mutations for the population with stationary distribution:

$n_k\ =\ \frac{Ne^{-\theta}\theta^k}{k!}$

$\theta=\ \lambda / s$

where, $n_k\$ is the number of individual carrying $k$ mutations, $N$ is the population size, $\lambda$ is the mutation rate and $(1-s)^k$ is the selection coefficient for a genome with $k$ mutations. Thus, the frequency of the individuals of the fittest class ($k =0$) is:

${n_0}\ = N \ \ e^{-\ \theta}$

In an asexual population which suffers from ratchet the frequency of fittest individuals would be small, and go extinct after few generations. This is called a click of the ratchet. Following each click, the rate of accumulation of deleterious mutation would increase, and ultimately results in the extinction of the population.

== The antiquity of recombination and Muller's ratchet ==
It has been argued that recombination was an evolutionary development as ancient as life on Earth. Early RNA replicators capable of recombination may have been the ancestral sexual source from which asexual lineages could periodically emerge. Recombination in the early sexual lineages may have provided a means for coping with genome damage. Muller's ratchet under such ancient conditions would likely have impeded the evolutionary persistence of the asexual lineages that were unable to undergo recombination.

== Muller's ratchet and mutational meltdown ==
Since deleterious mutations are harmful by definition, accumulation of them would result in loss of individuals and a smaller population size. Small populations are more susceptible to the ratchet effect and more deleterious mutations would be fixed as a result of genetic drift. This creates a positive feedback loop which accelerates extinction of small asexual populations. This phenomenon has been called mutational meltdown. It appears that mutational meltdown due to Muller's ratchet can be avoided by a little bit of sex as in the common apomictic asexual flowering plant Ranunculus auricomus.

== See also ==
- Evolution of sexual reproduction
- Genetic hitchhiking
- Hill–Robertson effect
