= Population bottleneck =

Sharp reduction in the size of a population

Population bottleneck followed by recovery or extinction

A population bottleneck or genetic bottleneck is a sharp reduction in the size of a population due to environmental events such as famines, earthquakes, floods, fires, disease, and droughts; or human activities such as genocide, speciocide, widespread violence or intentional culling. Such events can reduce the variation in the gene pool of a population; thereafter, a smaller population, with a smaller genetic diversity, remains to pass on genes to future generations of offspring. Genetic diversity remains lower, increasing only when gene flow from another population occurs or very slowly increasing with time as random mutations occur. This results in a reduction in the robustness of the population and in its ability to adapt to and survive selecting environmental changes, such as climate change or a shift in available resources. Alternatively, if survivors of the bottleneck are the individuals with the greatest genetic fitness, the frequency of the fitter genes within the gene pool is increased, while the pool itself is reduced.

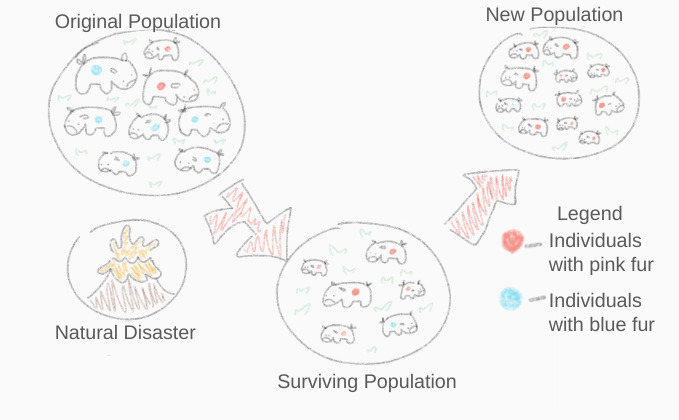
How a natural disaster leads to a reduction in genetic diversity in the population due to a drastic reduction in size.

The genetic drift caused by a population bottleneck can change the proportional random distribution of alleles and even lead to loss of alleles. The chances of inbreeding and genetic homogeneity can increase, possibly leading to inbreeding depression. Smaller population size can also cause deleterious mutations to accumulate.

Population bottlenecks play an important role in conservation biology (see minimum viable population size) and in the context of agriculture (biological and pest control).

== Minimum viable population size ==
In conservation biology, minimum viable population (MVP) size helps to determine the effective population size when a population is at risk for extinction. The effects of a population bottleneck often depend on the number of individuals remaining after the bottleneck and how that compares to the minimum viable population size.

== Founder effects ==
A slightly different form of bottleneck can occur if a small group becomes reproductively (e.g., geographically) separated from the main population, such as through a founder event, e.g., if a few members of a species successfully colonize a new isolated island, or from small captive breeding programs such as animals at a zoo. Alternatively, invasive species can undergo population bottlenecks through founder events when introduced into their invaded range.

== In humans ==
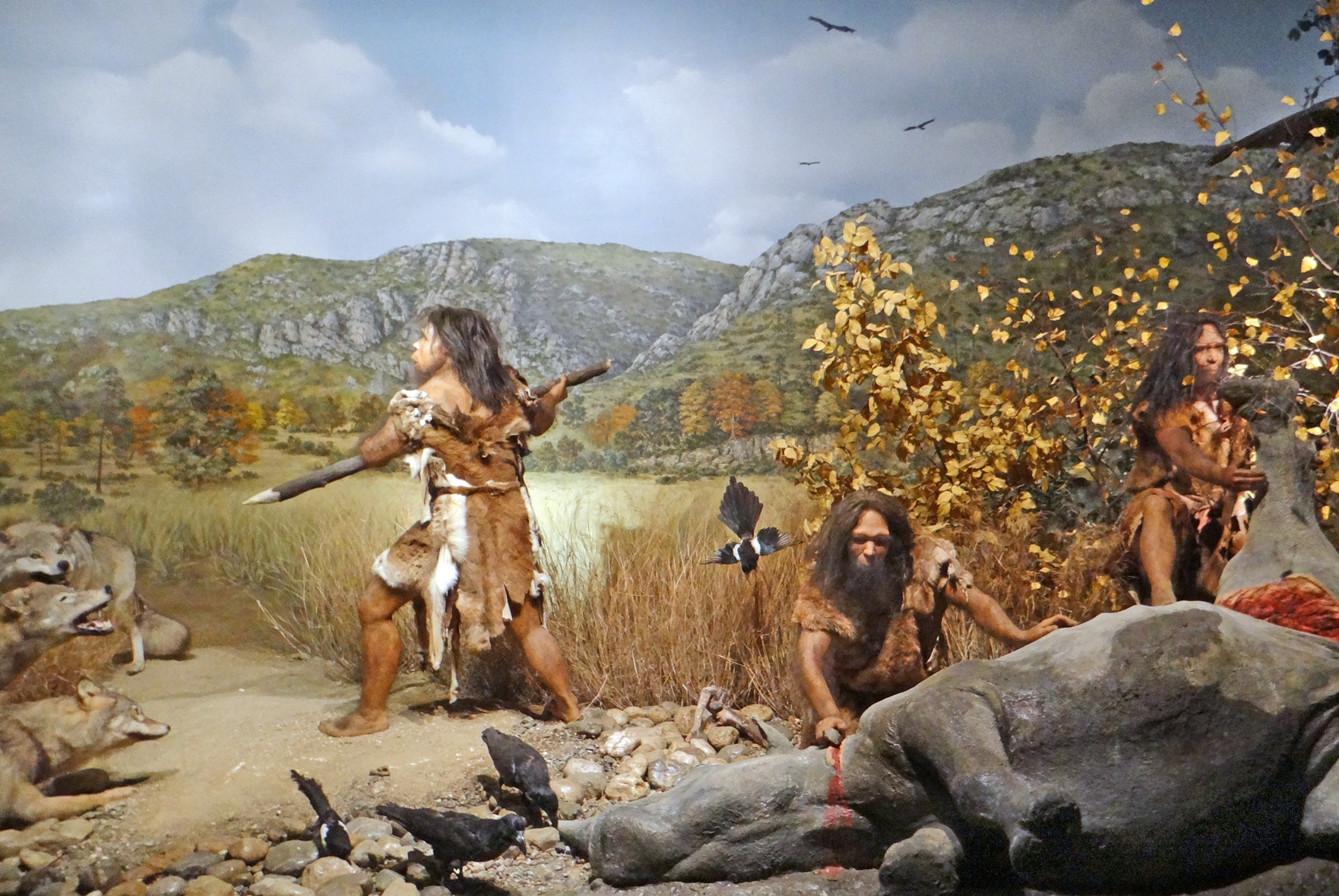
Homo heidelbergensis may have evolved from Homo ergaster following an intense population bottleneck 800–900,000 years ago.

According to a 1999 model, a severe population bottleneck, or more specifically a full-fledged speciation, occurred among a group of australopithecines as they transitioned to become Homo erectus two million years ago. It is believed that additional bottlenecks must have occurred since Homo erectus first appeared on Earth, but current archaeological, paleontological, and genetic data remains inadequate to assert definitively all the relevant cases where such bottlenecks occurred. Population bottlenecks within particular ethnicities and haplogroups, though, have been shown to have been relatively common across human history. The resulting loss of genomic diversity for these groups (who, in some cases, counted less than 100 members) and the inbreeding which occurred between the remnant population's descendants thereafter elevated certain genetic traits, producing significant homogeneity in features such as immunology and heightened predisposition towards the inheritance of certain genetic conditions and recessive hereditary diseases.

Groups that have faced the most severe bottlenecks over their history include a variety of Pacific and Indian Ocean island populations and mainland hunter-gatherer societies, as well as the Bronze Age Anatolian and Near Eastern steppe pastoralists from whom Eurasian populations are broadly descended today. One analysis has found that "64% of South Asian populations have [experienced] very strong founder events". Other groups known to have experienced such occurrences include Finns, Basques, and Ashkenazi Jews.

=== Proposed bottlenecks ===
==== Toba catastrophe theory ====
The controversial Toba catastrophe theory, presented in the late 1990s to early 2000s, suggested that a supervolcano eruption in Indonesia approximately 75,000 years ago caused a human population bottleneck to 10,000–30,000 individuals. The hypothesis was based on the apparent coinciding geological evidence of sudden climate change, coalescent evidence in some genes, and relatively low level of genetic variation within the human population. However, subsequent research, especially in the 2010s, appeared to refute both the genetic argument and the extent of climate change at the time.

==== Neolithic Y-chromosome bottleneck ====
The Neolithic Y-chromosome bottleneck refers to a period around 5000 BC when the diversity in the male y-chromosome dropped precipitously across Africa, Europe and Asia, to a level equivalent to reproduction occurring with a ratio between men and women of 1:17. Discovered in 2015, the research suggests that the reason for the bottleneck may not be a reduction in the number of males, but a drastic decrease in the percentage of males with reproductive success in Neolithic agropastoralist cultures, compared to the previous hunter gatherers.

==== Homo ergaster – heidelbergensis link ====
In 2000, a Molecular Biology and Evolution paper suggested a transplanting model or a 'long bottleneck' to account for the limited genetic variation in the human population, rather than a catastrophic environmental change. This would be consistent with suggestions that in sub-Saharan Africa numbers could have dropped at times as low as 2,000, for perhaps as long as 100,000 years, before they began to expand again in the Late Stone Age.

A 2023 genetic analysis proposed that a bottleneck affected the human ancestral species approximately 900,000 years ago. The population declined from roughly "100,000 to 1,000 individuals", with such conditions lasting approximately 117,000 years, and producing the significant homogeneity within the human genome that persists to present day. Early humans were thought to have been reduced to a population of no more than 1280 breeding individuals. It's believed that such a population would have to have "occupied a very localized area with good social cohesion [in order] for it to survive", with the sheer-length of the asserted conditions implying "a stable environment with sufficient resources and few stresses to the system'". The researchers believe the bottleneck's release contributed to intense genetic shifts, particularly in brain size, which ultimately led to humanity's transition to Homo heidelbergensis, understood to be the last common ancestor between Homo sapiens, Homo neanderthalis, and Homo denisova.

== Other animal species ==
Year	American bison (est)
Before 1492	60,000,000
1890	750
2000	360,000

European bison, also called wisent (Bison bonasus), faced extinction in the early 20th century. The animals living today are all descended from 12 individuals and thus have extremely low genetic variation, which may be starting to affect bull fertility. The population of American bison (Bison bison) fell due to a variety of factors, nearly leading to its extinction around the year 1890, though populations have since begun to recover (see table).

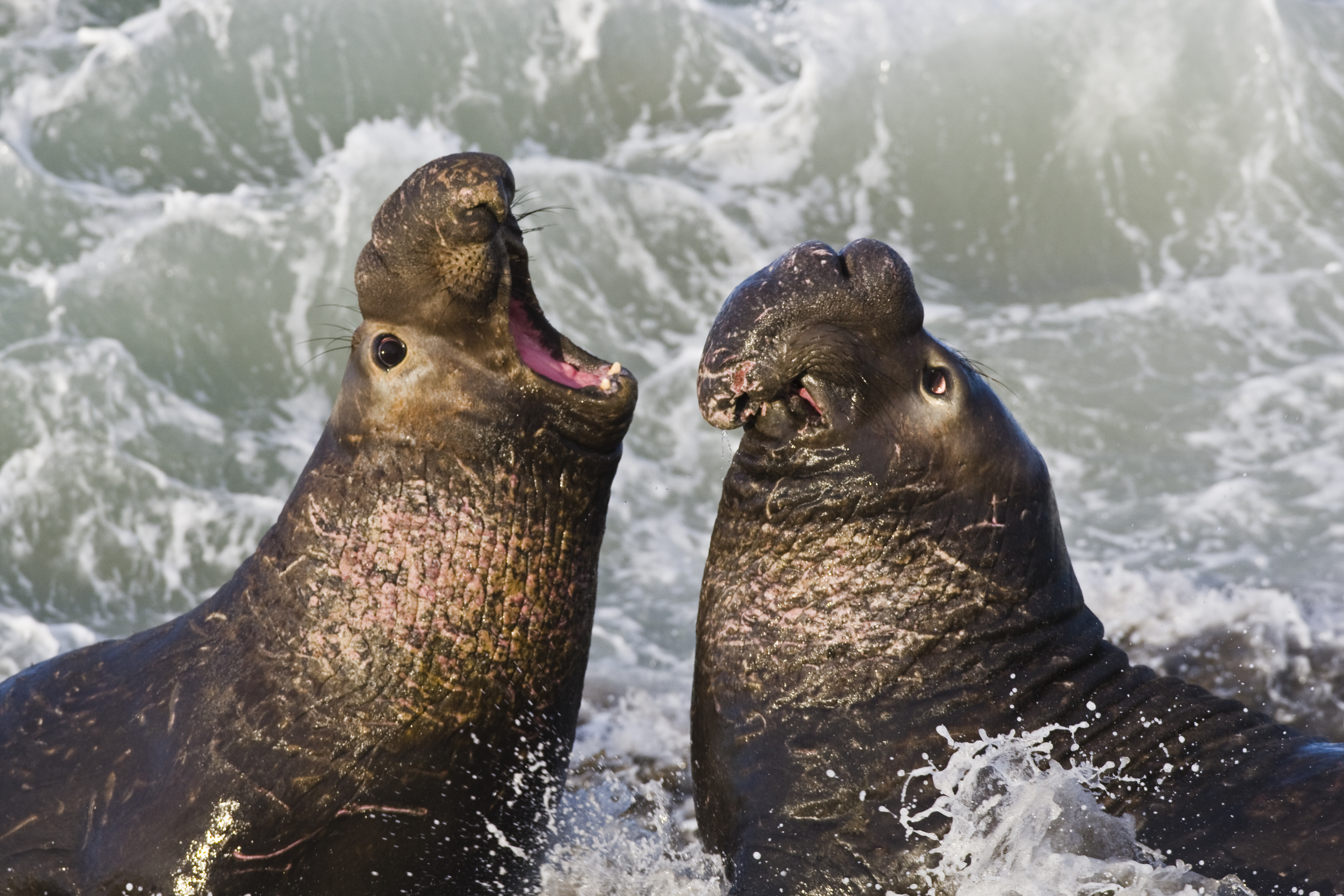
Overhunting pushed the northern elephant seal to the brink of extinction by the late 19th century. Although they have made a comeback, the genetic variation within the population remains very low.

A classic example of a population bottleneck is that of the northern elephant seal, whose population fell to about 30 in the 1890s. Although it now numbers in the hundreds of thousands, the potential for bottlenecks within colonies remains. Dominant bulls are able to mate with the largest number of females—sometimes as many as 100. With so much of a colony's offspring descended from just one dominant male, genetic diversity is limited, making the species more vulnerable to diseases and genetic mutations.

The golden hamster is a similarly bottlenecked species, with the vast majority of domesticated hamsters descended from a single litter found in the Syrian desert around 1930, and very few wild golden hamsters remain.

An extreme example of a population bottleneck is the New Zealand black robin, of which every specimen today is a descendant of a single female, called Old Blue. The Black Robin population is still recovering from its low point of only five individuals in 1980.

The genome of the giant panda shows evidence of a severe bottleneck about 43,000 years ago. There is also evidence of at least one primate species, the golden snub-nosed monkey, that also suffered from a bottleneck around this time. An unknown environmental event is suspected to have caused the bottlenecks observed in both of these species. The bottlenecks likely caused the low genetic diversity observed in both species.

Other facts can sometimes be inferred from an observed population bottleneck. Among the Galápagos Islands giant tortoises—themselves a prime example of a bottleneck—the comparatively large population on the slopes of the Alcedo volcano is significantly less diverse than four other tortoise populations on the same island. DNA analyses date the bottleneck to around 88,000 years before present (YBP). About 100,000 YBP the volcano erupted violently, deeply burying much of the tortoise habitat in pumice and ash.

Another example can be seen in the greater prairie chickens, which were prevalent in North America until the 20th century. In Illinois alone, the number of greater prairie chickens plummeted from over 100 million in 1900 to about 46 in 1998. These declines in population were the result of hunting and habitat destruction, but the random consequences have also caused a great loss in species diversity. DNA analysis comparing the birds from 1990 and mid-century shows a steep genetic decline in recent decades. Management of the greater prairie chickens now includes genetic rescue efforts including translocation of prairie chickens between leks to increase each population's genetic diversity.

Population bottlenecking poses a major threat to the stability of species populations as well. Papilio homerus is the largest butterfly in the Americas and is endangered according to the IUCN. The disappearance of a central population poses a major threat of population bottleneck. The remaining two populations are now geographically isolated and the populations face an unstable future with limited remaining opportunity for gene flow.

Genetic bottlenecks exist in cheetahs.

== In plants ==
Research showed that there is incredibly low, nearly undetectable amounts of genetic diversity in the genome of the Wollemi pine (Wollemia nobilis). The IUCN found a population count of 80 mature individuals and about 300 seedlings and juveniles in 2011, and previously, the Wollemi pine had fewer than 50 individuals in the wild. The low population size and low genetic diversity indicates that the Wollemi pine went through a severe population bottleneck.

A population bottleneck was created in the 1970s through the conservation efforts of the endangered Mauna Kea silversword (Argyroxiphium sandwicense ssp. sandwicense). The small natural population of silversword was augmented through the 1970s with outplanted individuals. All of the outplanted silversword plants were found to be first or subsequent generation offspring of just two maternal founders. The low amount of polymorphic loci in the outplanted individuals led to the population bottleneck, causing the loss of the marker allele at eight of the loci.

== Selective breeding ==
Bottlenecks also exist among pure-bred animals (e.g., dogs and cats: pugs, Persian) because breeders limit their gene pools to a few (show-winning) individuals for their looks and behaviors. The extensive use of desirable individual animals at the exclusion of others can result in a popular sire effect.

Selective breeding for dog breeds caused constricting breed-specific bottlenecks. These bottlenecks have led to dogs having an average of 2–3% more genetic loading than gray wolves. The strict breeding programs and population bottlenecks have led to the prevalence of diseases such as heart disease, blindness, cancers, hip dysplasia, and cataracts in domestic dogs.

Selective breeding to produce high-yielding crops has caused genetic bottlenecks in these crops and has led to genetic homogeneity. This reduced genetic diversity in many crops could lead to broader susceptibility to new diseases or pests, which threatens global food security.

== See also ==
- Baby boom
- Population decline
- Population growth
