= Ranajit Chakraborty =

Indian population geneticist (1946–2018)

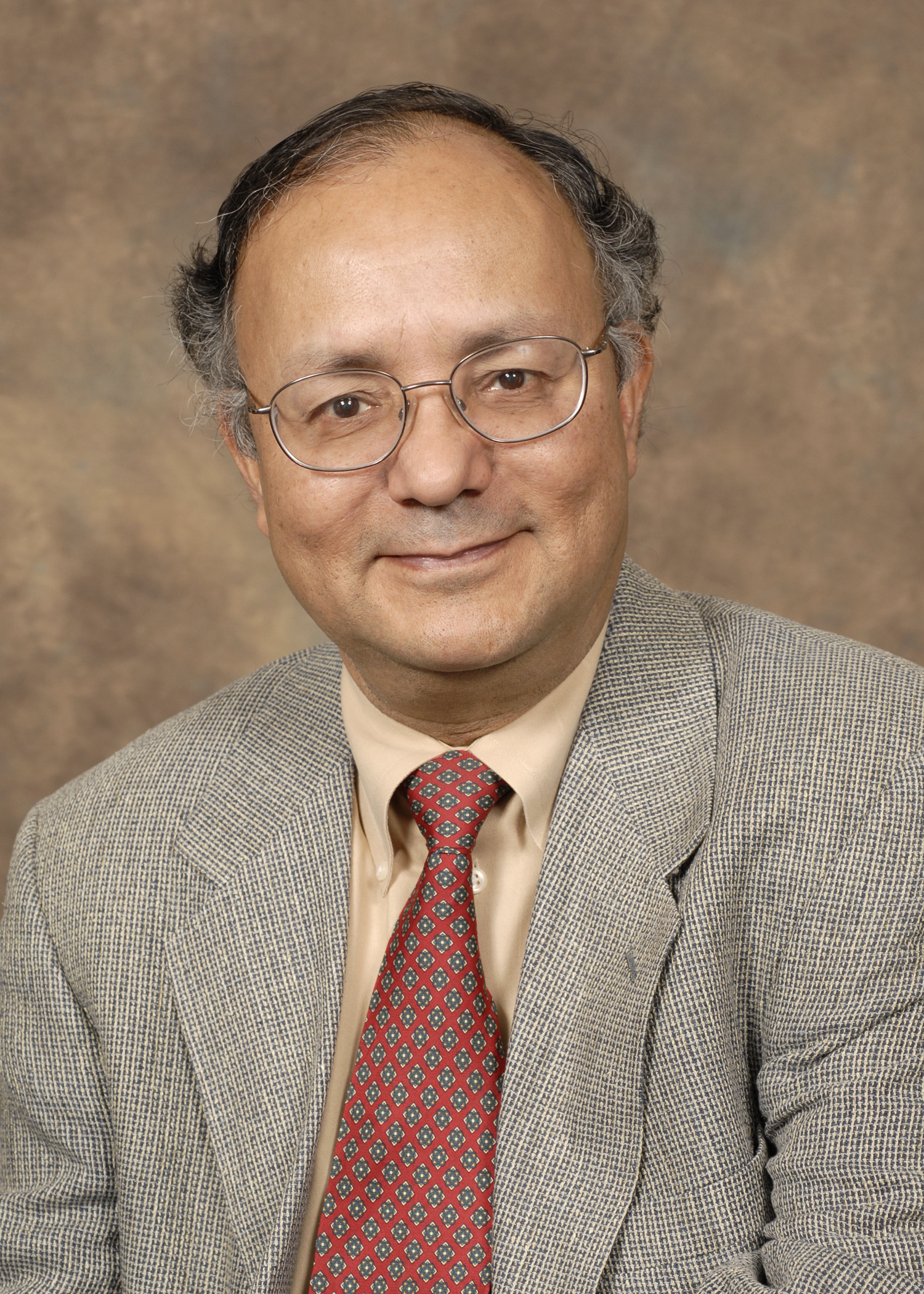
- Chakraborty, ca. 2008
- Born: Ranajit Chakraborty; April 17, 1946; Baranagore (West Bengal), India
- Died: September 23, 2018 (aged 72); Fort Worth, Texas, United States
- Education: Indian Statistical Institute
- Spouse: Dr. Bandana M. Chakraborty
- Scientific career
- Fields: Human genetics Population genetics Forensic genetics
- Workplaces: The University of Texas Health Science Center at Houston; University of Cincinnati; University of North Texas
- Doctoral advisor: C. R. Rao
- Doctoral students: Jill S. Barnholtz-Sloan

Ranajit Chakraborty (April 17, 1946 – September 23, 2018) was a human and population geneticist. At the time of his death, he was Director of the Center for Computational Genomics at the Institute of Applied Genetics and Professor in the Department of Forensic and Investigative Genetics at the University of North Texas Health Science Center in Fort Worth, Texas. His scientific contributions include studies in human genetics, population genetics, genetic epidemiology, statistical genetics, and forensic genetics.

== Early life and education ==
Ranajit Chakraborty was born in Baranagore (West Bengal), India. At his graduation from high school in 1963, he was awarded First Class with Distinction Certificate from the Board of Secondary Education of West Bengal. In 1967, got his Bachelor of Statistics degree (with honors) from the Indian Statistical Institute, Calcutta, and a year later was awarded a Master of Statistics (with specialization in Mathematical Genetics and Advanced Probability). In 1971, he got his Ph.D. in Biostatistics from the Indian Statistical Institute. His dissertation supervisor was C. R. Rao, FRS. Before obtaining his first tenure-track academic position, Chakraborty served as Research Scholar and Senior Research Fellow at the Indian Statistical Institute, Visiting Lecturer of Statistics at the Indian Institute of Management, and Visiting Consultant at the Data Reference Center of the World Health Organization at the University of Hawaii in Honolulu.

== Academic career ==
In 1973, Chakraborty joined the faculty at the Center for Demographic and Population Genetics, which is now the Human Genetics Center, at the University of Texas Health Science Center at Houston. From 1996 to 2001, he held the Allan King Professorship at the School of Public Health. In 2001, he became the Robert A. Kehoe Professor and Director of the Center for Genome Information at the University of Cincinnati Medical Center in Cincinnati, Ohio. In 2009, Chakraborty joined the Department of Forensic and Investigative Genetics, University of North Texas Health Science Center, Fort Worth, Texas.

In addition to his main academic appointments, throughout his career, Chakraborty served in various capacities on the faculties of University of Houston, Stanford University, Stockholm University, University of Michigan, Rice University, and Universidad de Chile.

== Scientific contributions ==
Ranajit Chakraborty wrote six books and over 600 scientific articles. Three of these became citation classics.

Chakraborty's research contributions were in three main areas. During the first phase of his professional career, he contributed to the development of population genetics and molecular evolution. In collaboration with Masatoshi Nei, Takeo Maruyama, and Paul Fuerst, he studied among others the effects of bottlenecks on genetic variability, the distributions of allele frequencies, and the distribution of single locus heterozygosity. He also contributed to the development of the two main mutation models in population genetics: the infinite alleles model and the stepwise mutation model. Ranajit Chakraborty made a large number of methodological contributions to population genetics, such as the use of the number of rare alleles per locus to estimate mutation rates.

The second area to which he made significant contributions was human genetics and human epidemiology. Among others, he studied the effects of consanguinity and consanguineous marriages on genetic load, the genetics of obesity, gallbladder disease, and type II diabetes.

His third area of research interest was forensic genetics, i.e., the use of DNA data and genetic methodology in the process of individual identification initially in criminal and civil cases, and later in determining ethnic ancestry and relationships. One of Dr. Chakraborty's main contributions to the methodology of identification by DNA data concerned the selection of control groups for ruling out errors in identification and for calculating precise probabilities of the two types of errors (false positives and false negatives). He also contributed to the study of microbial forensics, i.e., the rapid identification of bacterial agents used in bioterrorism and biocrimes.

In 1991, Ranajit Chakraborty and Kenneth Kidd published one of the first articles on the utility of DNA data in forensics. The importance of this paper in the rapid adoption of DNA-based methods by the legal system has been frequently commented upon.

== Scientific societies, service and honors ==
Dr. Chakraborty was a member or life member of a dozen or so scientific societies, among them the International Association of Human Biologists, the Indian Society of Human Genetics, the American Society of Human Genetics, The Genetics Society of America, the American Society of Naturalists, Sigma Xi, and the International Association of DNA Fingerprinting. He served as a member of the board of directors of the American Dermatoglyphics Association (1986-1890), Vice President of the Indian Society of Human Ecology (1990), and Vice President (1998-1999) and President (1999-2000) of the American Association of Anthropological Genetics. In 2001, he became Honorary Life Member of the Croatian Association of Anthropological Genetics, and in 2003, he became a Foreign Associate of the Chilean Academy of Science.

== Public service ==
The development of identification methods based on DNA data in the late 1980s have brought much of Dr. Chakarborty's work to the attention of the public and the government. In 1995, he became a member of the DNA subcommittee for the State of New York, and during the 1995-2000 period, Chakraborty served as a member of the US government National DNA Advisory Board. In both cases, Chakraborty helped develop policies on the use of DNA and approved the methodologies and statistical tools in identification procedures.

In 1995, Chakraborty and Dan Hartl testified for the prosecution in the O. J. Simpson murder case.

In 1998, Chakraborty was awarded the Federal Bureau of Investigation Award for "Efforts of Research in DNA forensics during the decade of DNA 1989-1998." In 2001, Dr. Chakraborty became an Advisory Board Member at Celera Genomics dealing with 9/11 victim identification by mtDNA markers. In 2002, Chakraborty became a member of the Working Group of bacterial Forensic Genetics at the FBI Academy.

Chakraborty testified at a 2012-2014 Frye standard Hearing before Brooklyn Judge Mark Dwyer to determine the validity and the admissibility of a method widely used by the New York City chief medical examiner to identify people on the basis of samples containing mixtures of blood from different people. His testimony was crucial in the reorganization of the New York City protocols for such identifications, and for reopening many cases previously decided on the basis of a faulty method.
