= Kreitman =

Kreitman may refer to:

== People with the surname ==
- Esther Kreitman (1891-1954), British novelist.
- Hyman Kreitman (1914-2001), British businessman.
- Martin Kreitman, American geneticist.
- Norman Kreitman (1927-2012), Scottish psychiatrist.

== Other ==
- McDonald–Kreitman test
