= Haldane's dilemma =

Limit on the speed of beneficial evolution

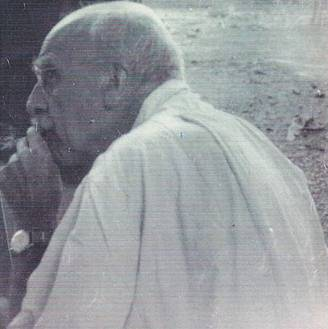
J. B. S. Haldane in 1964

Haldane's dilemma is a limit on the speed of beneficial evolution, calculated by J. B. S. Haldane in 1957. Motoo Kimura's landmark paper on neutral theory in 1968 built on Haldane's work to suggest that most molecular evolution across species is neutral, framing this is as a resolution to the dilemma. However, adaptive evolution might explain a significant fraction of substitutions in protein coding sequence. Other solutions have since been proposed.

== Presentation by Haldane ==
=== Substitution cost ===
In the introduction to The Cost of Natural Selection Haldane writes that it is difficult for breeders to simultaneously select all the desired qualities, partly because the required genes may not be found together in the stock; but, he writes,

especially in slowly breeding animals such as cattle, one cannot cull even half the females, even though only one in a hundred of them combines the various qualities desired.

That is, the problem for the cattle breeder is that breeding only from the specimens with the desired qualities will yield too few individuals in the next generation. Haldane states that this same problem arises with respect to natural selection. The problem is greatest for 'K-selected' species with low fecundity, and is less of an issue for 'r-selected' species with high fecundity. Haldane attempts

to make quantitative the fairly obvious statement that natural selection cannot occur with great intensity for a number of characters at once unless they happen to be controlled by the same genes.

In the case of selection on peppered moths, if "ten other independently inherited characters had been subject to selection of the same intensity as that for colour, only $(1/2)^{10}$, or one in 1024, of the original genotype would have survived." The species would most likely have become extinct; but it might well survive ten other selective periods of comparable selectivity, if they happened in different centuries.

=== Selection intensity ===
Haldane proceeds to define the intensity of selection regarding "juvenile survival" (that is, survival to reproductive age) as $I = \ln (s_0/S)$, where $s_0$ is the proportion of those with the optimal genotype (or genotypes) that survive to reproduce, and $S$ is the proportion of the entire population that similarly so survive. The proportion for the entire population that die without reproducing is thus $1-S$, and this would have been $1-s_0$ if all genotypes had survived as well as the optimal. Hence $s_0-S$ is the proportion of "genetic" deaths due to selection. As Haldane mentions, if $s_0 \approx S$, then $I \approx s_0-S$. (Note: See Haldane. If $a = 1-s_0$ and $b = 1-S$, then $I = \ln (1-a)-\ln (1-b)\approx -a+b = s_0-S$ .)

=== Haldane's cost ===
Haldane writes

I shall investigate the following case mathematically. A population is in equilibrium under selection and mutation. One or more genes are rare because their appearance by mutation is balanced by natural selection. A sudden change occurs in the environment, for example, pollution by smoke, a change of climate, the introduction of a new food source, predator, or pathogen, and above all migration to a new habitat. It will be shown later that the general conclusions are not affected if the change is slow. The species is less adapted to the new environment, and its reproductive capacity is lowered. It is gradually improved as a result of natural selection. But meanwhile, a number of deaths, or their equivalents in lowered fertility, have occurred. If selection at the $i^{th}$ selected locus is responsible for $d_i$ of these deaths in any generation the reproductive capacity of the species will be $\prod \left( 1- d_i \right)$ of that of the optimal genotype, or $\exp \left ( -\sum d_i\right)$ nearly, if every $d_i$ is small. Thus the intensity of selection approximates to $\sum d_i$.

Comparing to the above, we have that $d_i = s_{0i} - S$, if we say that $s_{0i}$ is the quotient of deaths for the $i^{th}$ selected locus and $S$ is again the quotient of deaths for the entire population.

Note that Haldane's model as stated here allows for more than one gene to move towards fixation at a time; but each of them adds to the cost of substitution.

Haldane states that he will show that $D_i$ depends mainly on $p_0$, the low frequency at which the allele is at the time of environmental change.

=== A mathematical model of the cost of diploids ===
Let A and a be two alleles with frequencies $p_n$ and $q_n$ in the $n^\mbox{th}$ generation. Their relative fitness is given by

Genotype	AA	Aa	aa
Frequency	$p_n^2$	$2p_nq_n$	$q_n^2$
Fitness	1	$1 - \lambda K$	$1 - K$

where 0 ≤ $K$ ≤ 1, and 0 ≤ λ ≤ 1.

If λ = 0, then Aa has the same fitness as AA, e.g. if Aa is phenotypically equivalent with AA (A dominant), and if λ = 1, then Aa has the same fitness as aa, e.g. if Aa is phenotypically equivalent with aa (A recessive). In general λ indicates how close in fitness Aa is to aa.

The fraction of selective deaths in the $n^\mbox{th}$ generation then is

$$d_n = 2\lambda Kp_nq_n + Kq_n^2 = Kq_n[2\lambda + (1 - 2\lambda)q_n]$$

and the total number of deaths is the population size multiplied by

$$D =  K \sum_0^\infin q_n \; [2\lambda + (1 - 2\lambda)q_n].$$

=== Origin of the number 300 ===
Haldane approximates the above equation by taking the continuum limit of the above equation. This is done by multiplying and dividing it by dq so that it is in integral form

$$dq_n=-Kp_n q_n[\lambda + (1-2 \lambda  )q_n ]$$

substituting q=1-p, the cost (given by the total number of deaths, 'D', required to make a substitution) is given by

$$D = \int_0^{q_{_0}} \frac{[2\lambda + (1 - 2\lambda)q]}{(1 - q)[\lambda + (1 - 2\lambda)q]}dq = \frac{1}{1 - \lambda} \int_0^{q_{_0}} \left[\frac{1}{1 - q} + \frac{\lambda(1 - 2\lambda)}{\lambda + (1 - 2\lambda)q}\right]dq.$$

Assuming λ < 1, this gives

$$D = \frac{1}{1 - \lambda} \left[-\mbox{ln } p_0 + \lambda \mbox{ ln }\left(\frac{1 - \lambda - (1 - 2\lambda) p_0}{\lambda}\right)\right] \approx \frac{1}{1 - \lambda} \left[-\mbox{ln } p_0 + \lambda \mbox{ ln }\left(\frac{1 - \lambda}{\lambda}\right)\right]$$

where the last approximation assumes $p_0$ to be small.

If λ = 1, then we have

$$D = \int_0^{q_{_0}} \frac{2 - q}{(1 - q)^2} dq = \int_0^{q_{_0}} \left[\frac{1}{1 - q} + \frac{1}{(1 - q)^2}\right]dq = p_0^{-1} - \mbox{ ln } p_0 + O(\lambda K).$$

In his discussion Haldane writes that the substitution cost, if it is paid by juvenile deaths, "usually involves a number of deaths equal to about 10 or 20 times the number in a generation" – the minimum being the population size (= "the number in a generation") and rarely being 100 times that number. Haldane assumes 30 to be the mean value.

Assuming substitution of genes to take place slowly, one gene at a time over n generations, the fitness of the species will fall below the optimum (achieved when the substitution is complete) by a factor of about 30/n, so long as this is small – small enough to prevent extinction. Haldane doubts that high intensities – such as in the case of the peppered moth – have occurred frequently and estimates that a value of n = 300 is a probable number of generations. This gives a selection intensity of $I = 30/300 = 0.1$.

Haldane then continues:

The number of loci in a vertebrate species has been estimated at about 40,000. 'Good' species, even when closely related, may differ at several thousand loci, even if the differences at most of them are very slight. But it takes as many deaths, or their equivalents, to replace a gene by one producing a barely distinguishable phenotype as by one producing a very different one. If two species differ at 1000 loci, and the mean rate of gene substitution, as has been suggested, is one per 300 generations, it will take 300,000 generations to generate an interspecific difference. It may take a good deal more, for if an allele a1 is replaced by a10, the population may pass through stages where the commonest genotype is a1a1, a2a2, a3a3, and so on, successively, the various alleles in turn giving maximal fitness in the existing environment and the residual environment.

== Impact on neutral theory as "Haldane's dilemma" ==
Kimura cited Haldane's argument as the reason why most sequence divergence between species had to be neutral rather than adaptive. The term "Haldane's dilemma" was introduced by paleontologist Leigh Van Valen in his 1963 paper "Haldane's Dilemma, Evolutionary Rates, and Heterosis".

Van Valen writes:

Haldane (1957 [= The Cost of Natural Selection]) drew attention to the fact that in the process of the evolutionary substitution of one allele for another, at any intensity of selection and no matter how slight the importance of the locus, a substantial number of individuals would usually be lost because they did not already possess the new allele. Kimura (1960, 1961) has referred to this loss as the substitutional (or evolutional) load, but because it necessarily involves either a completely new mutation or (more usually) previous change in the environment or the genome, I like to think of it as a dilemma for the population: for most organisms, rapid turnover in a few genes precludes rapid turnover in the others. A corollary of this is that, if an environmental change occurs that necessitates the rather rapid replacement of several genes if a population is to survive, the population becomes extinct.

That is, there is a speed limit to how many genes can fix within a given time. Note that Haldane's model assumes independence of genes at different loci; if the selection intensity is 0.1 for each gene moving towards fixation, and there are N such genes, then the reproductive capacity of the species will be lowered to 0.9^{N} times the capacity of an individual who had the ideal genotype at every locus.

The fraction of sequence divergence caused by adaptation is now known as "alpha" and estimated using versions of the McDonald–Kreitman test, based on comparing patterns of polymorphisms within species to patterns of divergence between species. This alpha parameter appears to be large in some species, although almost all approaches suggest that the human-chimp divergence was primarily neutral. However, if divergence between Drosophila species was as adaptive as the alpha parameter suggests, then it would exceed Haldane's limit.

== Formulation with reproductive excess ==
Haldane's original argument was flawed in referring to an optimal individual with the ideal genotype at every locus - such an individual does not typically exist. However, Masatoshi Nei and Joseph Felsenstein later independently developed versions of Haldane's argument that reached similar conclusions without being subject to this flaw. Instead of a model where adults give rise to adults, they explicitly modeled adults giving rise to juveniles who could survive to adulthood. "Reproductive excess" describes the degree to which the number of juveniles exceeds that needed to replenish the population, and it is reproductive excess that acts as a limit to the proportion of deaths that can be due to selection rather than to other causes. If the available juveniles are inadequate, a population will tend to go extinct - this is the theoretical basis behind lethal mutagenesis drug strategies against viruses. Haldane's claim that selection intensity is unlikely to exceed 10% was interpreted as a claim that no more than 10% of juvenile deaths would be caused by selection.

This formulation with respect to reproductive excess and a limit to the proportion of deaths that are selective has since been generalized to more complex life histories. Application to artificial plant populations found that the proportion of deaths that were selected far exceeded the 10% limit imagined, without empirical evidence, by Haldane.

== Epistasis ==
Negative epistasis, especially in the extreme form of a threshold model of truncation selection, can make selection more efficient.. Here, individuals with a phenotype less than the threshold die and individuals with a phenotype above the threshold are all equally fit. However, the relaxation of the limit in these models might in part be due to moving from models of absolute fitness to models of relative fitness.

== See also ==
- Error catastrophe
- Genetic drift
- Genetic load
- Muller's ratchet
