= Huang Shi =

Chinese geneticist and evolutionary biologist

Huang Shi (Chinese: 黄石; pinyin: Huáng Shí), frequently cited in academic journals as Shi Huang (born October 26, 1961), is a Chinese geneticist, a Furong Scholar, and a former professor at the State Key Laboratory of Medical Genetics at Central South University in Changsha

== Early life and education ==
Huang Shi was born in Dalian in 1961. He studied genetics at Fudan University from 1979 to 1983 and was selected as a fellow of the CUSBEA program in 1984. He earned his Ph.D. in biochemistry from the University of California, Davis in 1988. Following his postdoctoral research at the University of California, San Diego (1989–1992), he was named a Pew Scholar in 1993. After a long-term research career at the Burnham Institute for Medical Research, he returned to China in 2009 to accept a Furong Scholarship and a professorship at Central South University.

== Research interests ==
Huang's work focuses on cancer genetics and molecular evolution.

=== Epigenetics and oncology ===
During his postdoctoral research (1989–1992) in the laboratory of Wen-Hwa Lee at the University of California, San Diego, Huang investigated the retinoblastoma protein (Rb). His early research identified two distinct and frequently mutated regions of the Rb protein that are required for binding to the SV40 T antigen.Huang, S.; Wang, N. P.; Tseng, B. Y.; Lee, W. H.; Lee, E. H. (June 1990). "Two distinct and frequently mutated regions of retinoblastoma protein are required for binding to SV40 T antigen". The EMBO Journal. 9 (6): 1815–1822. doi:10.1002/j.1460-2075.1990.tb08306.x. PMC 551886. PMID 2161343. Following this, he spent a 16-year career (1992–2008) as a faculty member at the Sanford-Burnham Medical Research Institute in La Jolla, California. During this period, Huang became a co-discoverer of the tumor suppressor RIZ1 and the PRDM gene family. He demonstrated that the inactivation of these genes through methylation plays a major role in oncogenesis.Steele-Perkins, G.; Huang, S.; et al. (2001). "Tumor formation and inactivation of RIZ1". Genes & Development. 15 (17): 2250–2262. doi:10.1289/ehp.01109s4599. PMC 312773. PMID 11544170. His research also investigates the link between Western diet and cancer risk through mechanisms of epigenetics.Huang, S. (2002). "Histone methyltransferases, diet nutrients and tumour suppressors". Nature Reviews Cancer. 2 (6): 469–476. doi:10.1038/nrc824. PMID 12189387. Additionally, Huang expanded his research into the intersection of genetics and tumor susceptibility by developing models based on genome-wide variations. His work on the collective effects of single-nucleotide polymorphisms introduced the concept of Minor Allele Content (MAC), linking the accumulation of minor genetic variants to a statistically increased risk of complex diseases, including lung cancer.Zhu, Y.; Yuan, D.; Huang, S. (2018). "Collective effects of common SNPs and risk prediction in lung cancer". Journal of Human Genetics. 12 (1): 537–547. Bibcode:2018Hered.121..537L. doi:10.1038/s41437-018-0063-4. PMC 6221896. PMID 29523840.

=== Molecular evolution and paleoanthropology ===
Since 2003, Huang has advocated for the Maximum Genetic Diversity (MGD) theory. This theory serves as an alternative to the neutral theory of molecular evolution and postulates an upper limit for genetic variation in complex organisms. It assumes that the genetic variation of all species has a ceiling that is inversely proportional to the complexity of the species.

Based on the MGD model, Huang and his team proposed the alternative "Out of East Asia" hypothesis for the origin of modern humans, challenging the mainstream "Out of Africa" model by arguing that the lower autosomal genetic diversity observed in East Asian populations points to an ancestral origin rather than a bottleneck.

==== Genetic equidistance ====
A substantial part of Huang's work deals with the reinterpretation of the genetic equidistance phenomenon. While the conventional molecular clock assumes that the rate of amino acid substitutions remains constant over time, Huang postulates that this equidistance is a result of maximum genetic diversity. He also demonstrated this phenomenon at the nucleotide level.

== Reception and academic impact ==
In oncology, Huang's discovery of the RIZ1 tumor suppressor gene (PRDM2) and his definition of the PRDM protein family have been widely recognized and verified by independent research groups. Independent reviews in developmental biology credit Huang's early laboratory work with establishing the functional understanding of how PRDM gene imbalances contribute to human malignancies. His early research on gene regulation and development was reviewed in academic reference books, such as the Handbook of Developmental Science, Behavior, and Genetics by Mae-Wan Ho.

In evolutionary biology, Huang's alternative frameworks have generated both academic application and critical scientific debate. In 2022, the MGD theory was featured in David R. Bickel's university textbook on phylogenetic trees. Independent researchers have utilized and cited Huang's model in studies regarding discrete system behaviors, and the genetic diversity analysis of endangered species.

The MGD model's implications on genetic saturation have been examined and compared alongside other evolutionary hypotheses, such as the tripartite genome structure. Conversely, his evolutionary interpretations have met with direct academic criticism and skepticism, with independent peer reviews explicitly evaluating and debating the methodology of the genetic equidistance and maximum genetic diversity hypothesis.

Huang's structural critiques of the molecular clock and his alternative models have been highlighted in monographic evaluations of modern evolutionary theory, including Michael Denton's Evolution: Still a Theory in Crisis. Additionally, his paleoanthropological "Out of East Asia" model has been cited and discussed in independent monographs re-evaluating early human ancestry and non-bottleneck models, such as M. K. Martin's The Wrong Ape for Early Human Origins.

Huang's non-traditional hypotheses have drawn broader coverage from international media outlets, including the South China Morning Post and JFDaily, discussing the regional and global evolutionary implications of his research. Additionally, Huang is recognized as an invited scholar member of "The Third Way of Evolution" scientific network.

== Selected publications ==
- Huang, S.; Wang, N. P.; Tseng, B. Y.; Lee, W. H.; Lee, E. H. (June 1990). "Two distinct and frequently mutated regions of retinoblastoma protein are required for binding to SV40 T antigen". The EMBO Journal. 9 (6): 1815–1822. doi:10.1002/j.1460-2075.1990.tb08306.x. PMC 551886. PMID 2161343.
- Buyse, I. M.; Shao, G.; Huang, S. (1995-05-09). "The retinoblastoma protein binds to RIZ, a zinc-finger protein that shares an epitope with the adenovirus E1A protein". Proceedings of the National Academy of Sciences. 92 (10): 4467–4471. Bibcode:1995PNAS...92.4467B. doi:10.1073/pnas.92.10.4467. PMC 41965. PMID 7538672.
- Fears, S.; Mathieu, C.; Zeleznik-Le, N.; Huang, S.; Rowley, J. D.; Nucifora, G. (1996-02-20). "Intergenic splicing of MDS1 and EVI1 occurs in normal tissues as well as in myeloid leukemia and produces a new member of the PR domain family". Proceedings of the National Academy of Sciences. 93 (4): 1642–1647. Bibcode:1996PNAS...93.1642F. doi:10.1073/pnas.93.4.1642. PMC 39995. PMID 8643684.
- Huang, S. (2002). "Histone methyltransferases, diet nutrients and tumour suppressors". Nature Reviews Cancer. 2 (6): 469–476. doi:10.1038/nrc819. PMID 12189312.
