= Genetic relationship =

Genetic relationship may refer to:

- Genetic distance, in genetics
- Genetic relationship, in language
- Genetic geneaology, in genetics
- Genetic linkage, in genetics
