= Kelly's ZnS =

Kelly's $Z_{nS}$ is a test statistic that can be used to test a genetic region for deviations from the neutral model, based on the squared correlation of allelic identity between loci.

== Details ==
Given loci $i$ and $j$, $D_{ij}$ the Linkage Disequilibrium between these loci, is denoted as

$D_{ij} = p_{ij}-p_ip_j$

where $p_{ij}$ is the frequency of the alternative allele at i and j co-occurring and $p_{i}$ and $p_{j}$ the frequency of the alternative allele at $i$ and $j$ respectively.

a standardised measure of this is $\delta_{ij}$ the squared correlation of allelic identity between loci $i$ and $j$

$\delta_{ij} = \frac{D_{ij}^2}{p_i(1 - p_i)p_j (1-p_j)}$

Where $Z_{nS}$ averages $\delta_{ij}$ over all pairwise combinations between S loci.

$Z_{nS} = \frac{2}{S(S-1)}\sum_{i=1}^{S-1} \sum_{j=i+1}^{S} \delta_{ij}$

== Usage ==
Inflated $Z_{nS}$ scores indicate a deviation from the neutral model and can be used as a potential signature of previous selection
