= Andrew E. Sloan =

American neurosurgeon and academic

Andrew Edward Sloan is an American neurosurgeon and physician-scientist. He is the Peter D. Cristal Chair of Neurosurgical Oncology at Case Western Reserve University. In June 2000, Sloan married biostatistician and data scientist Jill S. Barnholtz-Sloan at the Missouri Botanical Garden.

He graduated from Yale College and Harvard Medical School.
