= Sarah Tishkoff =

American geneticist (born 1965)

Sarah Anne Tishkoff
- Born: December 26, 1965 (age 60); United States
- Education: University of California, Berkeley (B.S.); Yale University (M.Phil., Ph.D.)
- Spouse: Evan Leach
- Awards: NSF Sloan Postdoctoral fellowship in molecular evolution (1996-1998); Burroughs Wellcome Fund Career Award in the Biomedical Sciences (1998-2005); David and Lucile Packard Foundation Career Award in Science and Engineering (2001-2006); NIH Director's Pioneer Award (2009)
- Scientific career
- Fields: Population Genetics; Epigenetics; Genomics
- Workplaces: University of Pennsylvania; University of Maryland
- Thesis: Patterns of nuclear haplotype frequency variation and linkage disequilibrium in a global sample of human populations (1996)
- Doctoral advisor: Kenneth Kidd
- Website: www.med.upenn.edu/tishkoff

Sarah Anne Tishkoff (born December 26, 1965) is an American geneticist and the David and Lyn Silfen Professor in the Department of Genetics and Biology at the University of Pennsylvania. She also serves as a director for the American Society of Human Genetics and is an associate editor at PLOS Genetics, G3 (Genes, Genomes, and Genetics), and Genome Research. She is also a member of the scientific advisory board at the David and Lucile Packard Foundation.

Tishkoff has been a leading figure in using genetics to advance understanding of modern human diversity. In particular she has made significant contributions to research on human genetic variation in African populations. In 1996, she and colleagues published the first paper to support the Out-of-Africa hypothesis using the nuclear genome, illustrating the extent of diversity among African populations. In 2001, Tishkoff and colleagues were some of the first to show the genomic signature of natural selection in human populations.

Some of her most cited research is a study on genomic variation around the lactase gene, the first to show coevolution of a cultural and genetic trait. Tishkoff was able to link evolution of cattle domestication to lactase persistence. Her more recent work includes the largest genomic study across ethnically diverse Africans, and the identification of novel genetic variants associated with skin color.

Tishkoff is a recipient of a National Institutes of Health Director's Pioneer Award, a David and Lucile Packard Career Award, a Burroughs/Wellcome Fund Career Award, and a Penn Integrates Knowledge (PIK) endowed chair. She was elected to the National Academy of Sciences in 2017.

== Early life ==
Sarah Tishkoff was born on December 26, 1965, in Los Angeles, California. She moved from Los Angeles to East Lansing, Michigan, when she was five, and from East Lansing to Klamath Falls, Oregon, in her early teens. Her parents were both involved in academia. Her father was a professor of hematology and oncology at the University of California, Los Angeles and later the Director of the Red Cross for the Midwest of the United States. Her mother was a professor of history at the Oregon Institute of Technology. Tishkoff attended the University of California, Berkeley for her undergraduate degree. While in high school, she read Coming of Age in Samoa by Margaret Mead, sparking her initial interest in cultural anthropology.

Tishkoff's career was significantly influenced by several mentors throughout her education. While at UC Berkeley, she took courses in linguistics, cultural anthropology, physical anthropology, and archaeology, among other subjects. While at UC Berkeley, she was particularly inspired by Allan Wilson's research using molecular approaches to understand evolutionary change. She was further inspired by many of Wilson's graduate students, including Vincent Sarich, Mary Claire-King, and George Sensabaugh.

In particular, while at UC Berkeley she took a course taught by Vincent Sarich, who was interested in genetics, human development, and evolution, and worked on comparing proteins in humans with those in chimpanzees. His unique teaching style and controversial comments piqued Tishkoff's interest in the field, and encouraged her to question human origins and the genetic basis of human traits more deeply. After realizing its importance in conducting her work on human evolutionary history, she added genetics as an additional major at UC Berkeley.

Tishkoff cites her experience meeting the Khoisan people at a meeting on Khoisan origins in Cape Town, during her time in Johannesburg, as a transformative event, as the Khoisan people have one of the oldest genetic lineages in the world. During this visit she met with cultural anthropologists, geneticists, and representatives of Khoisan groups.

Tishkoff became a professor at the University of Maryland in 2000, and went to the field for the first time a year later. This initial four-month-long trip, funded by the David and Lucile Packard Career Award, allowed her to pursue fieldwork that led to research in African population history and the genetics of variable traits and disease. Tishkoff's lab continues to conduct field work in Africa, taking care to do the research ethically. Her lab works to have their African collaborators treated as equal partners in the research, and ensures research results are sent back to participants.

Tishkoff is married to Evan Leach, whom she met on her first day at Yale graduate school. She currently resides in Pennsylvania.

== Education ==
Tishkoff graduated with a Bachelor of Science in genetics and a Bachelor of Arts in anthropology from the University of California, Berkeley in 1989. She went on to receive her Master of Philosophy in human genetics from the Yale School of Medicine in 1992. Tishkoff completed her formal education upon acquiring her PhD in genetics from Yale University in 1996, under the continued advisement of Kenneth Kidd. While working in the Kidd Lab, Tishkoff developed an interest in African genomics and evolution, leading her to write her thesis on the "Patterns of nuclear haplotype frequency variation and linkage disequilibrium in a global sample of human populations". Shortly after completing her PhD, Tishkoff continued the research started in her thesis, and consequently published a paper titled "Global patterns of linkage disequilibrium at the CD4 locus and modern human origins" in the journal Science.

== Career ==
From 1997 to 2000, Tishkoff was a postdoctoral fellow at The Pennsylvania State University. During this period, Tishkoff was researching links between stable polymorphisms and microsatellites in human populations with Dr. Andrew G. Clark. She was also a visiting research fellow in 1997 at the University of the Witwatersrand in South Africa. In 2000, Tishkoff became an Assistant Professor in the Department of Biology at the University of Maryland, College Park. In 2005, Tishkoff was promoted to Associate Professor and she held that position until she left the university in 2007.

In 2008, Tishkoff became the David and Lyn Silfen University Associate Professor at the University of Pennsylvania. In 2012, Tishkoff became a Full Professor at the University of Pennsylvania, where she is currently the David and Lyn Silfen University Professor. Tishkoff also currently holds appointments in the Department of Biology, which is within the University's School of Arts and Sciences, and in the Department of Genetics, which is within the University's School of Medicine. Tishkoff and her lab members study evolutionary genomics, African phenotypic diversity, the genetic basis of resistance to infectious diseases, and the genetic basis of human adaptations. Their work combines field work, laboratory research, and computational approaches to examine the effect of genetic variation in living and past African populations.

In 2017, Tishkoff was elected to the National Academy of Sciences, which is considered a high honor that recognizes distinguished scientists in their respective fields. Throughout her career, Tishkoff has also been a part of numerous professional associations and scientific societies. She currently serves on the board of director for the American Society of Human Genetics, and she is a member of the scientific advisory board at the David and Lucile Packard Foundation. She is an associate editor at PLOS Genetics, G3 (Genes, Genomes, and Genetics), and Genome Research.

== Research ==
The primary focus of Tishkoff's research career has been on human genetic variation in African populations. The central aims of her research are to better understand the origins of modern humans and the histories of African populations, and the genetic underpinnings of disease susceptibility. Advances in these areas of research may aid drug development for diseases with known genetic bases, and the development of more effective medical treatments for living African populations.

=== African genomics ===
==== Integrative genomics ====
Tishkoff's research methodology applies an integrative genomics approach that combines data from the genome, epigenome, proteome, transcriptome, metabolome, and microbiome of various African ethnic groups to identify genetic and environmental factors that affect traits related to human measurements, metabolism and immune system.

==== Evolutionary genomics ====
Tishkoff's work also addresses questions about the evolutionary history of Homo sapiens. One of the key findings in this area of research includes the discovery of genetic signatures of interbreeding between anatomically modern humans and extinct hominins. Tishkoff was also involved in a study that rejected the hypothesis that ancestors of anatomically modern humans were genetically isolated in Africa. This study was based on whole-genome simulations from two Western African Pygmy populations, Biaka and Baka, and suggested the existence of introgression from an unknown archaic population.

==== Phenotypic diversity ====
Sarah Tishkoff and colleagues also focus their research on acquiring genomic and phenotypic data from geographically and culturally distinct African populations, which are underrepresented in genetic studies and whose analysis may uncover new aspects of human evolutionary history, including susceptibility to diseases and migration patterns. By genotyping approximately 2400 individuals from 121 geographically diverse African populations, Tishkoff and colleagues found evidence for 14 genetically divergent ancestral populations in Africa, and by comparing the genetic information with archaeological and self-described phenotypic data they showed high cultural and linguistic similarity within each cluster. Using their novel set of acquired genetic markers they were also able to trace back the shared ancestry of African Americans with African populations, finding a dominant shared ancestry from Niger-Kordofanian populations in Western Africa. Additionally, based on this research they have claimed that migrations from non-African populations into northern Africa resulted in increased genetic diversity in that region. Their work has demonstrated the need for further genomic analyses of African populations as a means of identifying correlations between allele frequencies and risk of certain diseases, and potentially designing therapeutic drugs for treating diseases in populations with similar genetic backgrounds.

=== Genotypic and phenotypic adaptation in humans ===
Another focus of Tishkoff's research group is understanding how different geographical and environmental influences correlate with genotypic and phenotypic changes in African populations.

==== Resistance to infectious disease ====
Tishkoff has focused on the influence of malaria on human populations to study the genetic basis of resistance to infectious diseases. Tishkoff and colleagues found that the presence of malaria was correlated with the allele frequencies of the G6PD that are believed to provide resistance to malaria but also to increase the risk of blood-related diseases. Haplotype analysis of Med and A- allele mutations at the G6PD locus revealed that their increased frequency occurred after the agricultural practices began. Tishkoff and colleagues suggested that agriculture led to greater exposure to malaria, which created a selective pressure for alleles that confer resistance.

Tishkoff and colleagues examined the diversity of the malarial-susceptible locus, ICAM-1, and found greater variation within African populations compared to variation in other global populations. They also found several alleles at the locus that were found ubiquitously in malarial regions, and one of them, "ICAM-1Kilifi," was present in high frequencies in Asian and African populations. This research suggested that there is a strong association between these allele frequencies and the presence of malaria, and that its analysis would help to find factors that affect malarial susceptibility and resistance. In the same year, Tishkoff proposed that an adaptation to one infectious disease can make humans more susceptible to other diseases. Two coding variants, G1 and G2, for the APOL1 protein are associated with resistance to African trypanosomiasis, or African sleeping sickness, but they also increase the risk of chronic kidney diseases.

==== Lactase persistence ====
In a 2007 study published in Nature Genetics, Tishkoff and colleagues documented three new single-nucleotide polymorphisms (SNPs) associated with lactase persistence (G/C-14010, T/G-13915 and C/G-13907) among ethnic groups in East Africa that differ from the allele associated with lactose tolerance that is common in Europe (C/T-13910). The most widespread mutation was found among Nilo-Saharan speaking groups in Tanzania and Kenya, while two independent mutations were found among the Beja people in Sudan and Afroasiatic speaking people in Kenya. The SNPs significantly increase the in-vitro activation of the lactase gene, which is known as LCT. These mutations are an example of convergent evolution due to the shared cultural selective pressures of animal domestication and milk consumption, and they are a clear case of gene-culture coevolution.

A 2014 study published in the American Journal of Human Genetics documented two more SNPs that have significant associations with the lactase persistence trait. The study also found the European variant C/T-13910 among some pastoralist groups in Northern and Central Africa.

==== High altitude adaptations in Ethiopians ====
In 2012, Tishkoff participated in a study published in Genome Biology that compared the hemoglobin levels between populations living at high and low altitudes in Ethiopia. The study found that there are statistically significant differences in the hemoglobin levels between the high altitude population, the Amhara people, and the low altitude population, the Aari and Hamar people. The genomic analysis recovered different gene candidates underlying adaptation to high altitude (CBARA1, VAV3, ARNT2, and THRB). This study demonstrates another example of convergent evolution, since the mutations found in the Ethiopian high altitude population are different than the ones found in Tibetan and Andean populations.

==== PTC taste perception ====
Sarah Tishkoff participated in the first study on variability in PTC taste perception. PTC is the bitter antithyroid compound phenylthiocarbamide, and the ability to perceive this compound is attributed to the gene TAS2R38. TAS2R38 is hypothesized to underlie a dietary adaptation that allows for avoidance of bitter-tasting poisonous foods. Tishkoff and colleagues hypothesized that African populations with different diets would have differences in their receptor genes due to selection associated with their diets. The study was based on a sample of 57 African populations consisting of 611 individuals and a comparative set of 132 non-Africans from the Middle East, Asia, and the Americas. Researchers measured participants' PTC bitter taste sensitivity using a modified version of the Harris - Kalmus threshold method, sequenced genomes, and completed haplotype and genotype–phenotype association analyses. Results failed to support the original hypothesis. African populations with divergent diets showed similar haplotype frequencies and there was little genetic differentiation between Africans and non-Africans. This stability suggests that variation of TAS2R38 is functionally important and does more than just steer us away from bitter tasting potential toxins.

==== Short stature in western African pygmies ====
Tishkoff also participated in a study on the adaptive evolution of Western African Pygmies and three neighboring Bantu-speaking agricultural populations with whom they admixed. This study aimed to gain a broadened understanding of the genetic basis of phenotypic diversity in Africa. The sample included 132 individuals from six populations, including three from pygmy populations, and methods included genotyping and ancestry estimation. Results suggested that the short stature in Western African Pygmies may have resulted from selection for early reproduction, and metabolic and immune functions and that there may have been several selective events at different times in pygmy evolution.

== Science education ==
Tishkoff has numerous open-access online videos of topics relevant to her work, released in conjunction with a variety of research organizations, academic conferences, and educational foundations. She participated in the Howard Hughes Medical Institute's Biointeractive Lecture Series on Bones, Stones, and Genes: The Origin of Modern Humans. These themed events provided free scientific educational content online to "help bridge the gap between the textbook and the latest scientific findings". Similarly, Tishkoff has released a short series of research talks on African Genomics with the organization iBiology, whose mission is to "convey, in the form of open-access free videos, the excitement of modern biology and the process by which scientific discoveries are made". Other notable examples are her videos on The Evolution of Human Biodiversity: Local Adaptation, Adaptation to Taste and Lactose Intolerance in Africa, and Evolution and Adaptation in Africa: Implications for Health and Disease.

== Awards, honors, and memberships ==
As an undergraduate at University of California, Berkeley, Tishkoff received the UC Berkeley President's Undergraduate Fellowship in 1987 and graduated with University high honors and honors in anthropology. She later received the Fulbright/DAAD Predoctoral Fellowship for her research work in Germany from 1991 to 1992. After she received her PhD, she received a National Science Foundation Postdoctoral Fellowship for her research in molecular evolution from 1996 to 1998. As a postdoctoral fellow at the University of Maryland, Tishkoff received a grant from the Burroughs Wellcome Fund to fund her research on human resistance to malaria in Africa from 1998 to 2003. Her work would go on to be acknowledged by the David and Lucile Packard Fellowship for Science and Engineering in 2001.

While serving on the faculty at University of Maryland's College of Life Sciences, Tishkoff received the Junior Faculty Excellence Award in 2003. At her time at University of Pennsylvania, Tishkoff became an Integrates Knowledge Professor in 2008 for her work in African ancestry, lactase persistence, and taste sensitivity. In 2009, Tishkoff was awarded the National Institutes of Health Director's Pioneer Award to fund her research in Africa detailing genetic and environmental factors that influence human physiological traits. She was elected to the National Academy of Sciences in 2017, and is also on the board of directors for the American Society of Human Genetics (ASHG). In 2019, she received the Curt Stern Award from AHSG in recognition of her work on African human genetics.
