= Infinite alleles model =

The infinite alleles model is a mathematical model for calculating genetic mutations. The Japanese geneticist Motoo Kimura and American geneticist James F. Crow (1964) introduced the infinite alleles model, an attempt to determine for a finite diploid population what proportion of loci would be homozygous. This was, in part, motivated by assertions by other geneticists that more than 50 percent of Drosophila loci were heterozygous, a claim they initially doubted. In order to answer this question they assumed first, that there were a large enough number of alleles so that any mutation would lead to a different allele (that is the probability of back mutation to the original allele would be low enough to be negligible); and second, that the mutations would result in a number of different outcomes from neutral to deleterious.

They determined that in the neutral case, the probability that an individual would be homozygous, F, was:

$$F = {1 \over 4 N_e u + 1}$$

where u is the mutation rate, and N_{e} is the effective population size. The effective number of alleles n maintained in a population is defined as the inverse of the homozygosity, that is

$$n = {1 \over F} =  4N_e u + 1$$

which is a lower bound for the actual number of alleles in the population.

If the effective population is large, then a large number of alleles can be maintained. However, this result only holds for the neutral case, and is not necessarily true for the case when some alleles are subject to selection, i.e. more or less fit than others, for example when the fittest genotype is a heterozygote (a situation often referred to as overdominance or heterosis).

In the case of overdominance, because Mendel's second law (the law of segregation) necessarily results in the production of homozygotes (which are by definition in this case, less fit), this means that population will always harbor a number of less fit individuals, which leads to a decrease in the average fitness of the population. This is sometimes referred to as genetic load, in this case it is a special kind of load known as segregational load. Crow and Kimura showed that at equilibrium conditions, for a given strength of selection (s), that there would be an upper limit to the number of fitter alleles (polymorphisms) that a population could harbor for a particular locus. Beyond this number of alleles, the selective advantage of presence of those alleles in heterozygous genotypes would be cancelled out by continual generation of less fit homozygous genotypes.

These results became important in the formation of the neutral theory, because neutral (or nearly neutral) alleles create no such segregational load, and allow for the accumulation of a great deal of polymorphism. When Richard Lewontin and J. Hubby published their groundbreaking results in 1966 which showed high levels of genetic variation in Drosophila via protein electrophoresis, the theoretical results from the infinite alleles model were used by Kimura and others to support the idea that this variation would have to be neutral (or result in excess segregational load).

== See also ==
- Infinite sites model
