= Jill Barnholtz-Sloan =

American biostatistician and data scientist

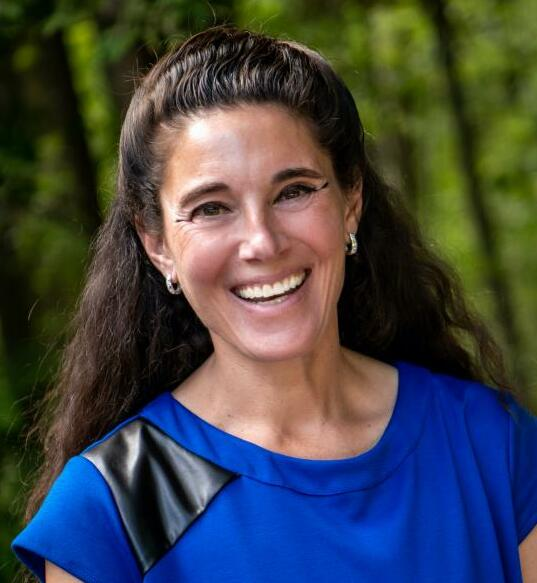
- Born: Jill Suzanne Barnholtz
- Education: University of Texas at Austin; UTHealth School of Public Health
- Spouse: Andrew E. Sloan (m. 2000)
- Scientific career
- Fields: Biostatistics, data science, cancer epidemiology
- Workplaces: Karmanos Cancer Institute; Case Western Reserve University School of Medicine; University Hospitals Health System; National Cancer Institute
- Thesis: Traditional linkage analysis in admixed families (2000)
- Doctoral advisor: Ranajit Chakraborty

Jill Suzanne Barnholtz-Sloan is an American biostatistician and data scientist specialized in cancer epidemiology and etiologic investigations of brain tumors. She is a senior investigator and associate director for informatics and data science at the National Cancer Institute.

== Life ==
Barnholtz was born to Barbara Barnholtz, a Jewish Community Center assistant developmental director and Martin Barnholtz, a Creve Coeur city councilor. She completed an M.S. in statistics from the University of Texas at Austin. Barnholtz earned a Ph.D. in biostatistics from the UTHealth School of Public Health. Her 2000 dissertation was titled Traditional linkage analysis in admixed families. In June 2000, she married physician-scientist and neurosurgeon Andrew E. Sloan at the Missouri Botanical Garden.

In 2002, Barnholtz-Sloan was an assistant professor at the Karmanos Cancer Institute. In 2007, she joined the Case Comprehensive Cancer Center. She worked in multiple roles in the Case Western Reserve University School of Medicine (CWRU) and the University Hospitals Health System (UHHS), which all focused on optimizing the use of data and analytics to advance health care. She has experience with multi-site, brain tumor, patient recruitment, and biological specimen collection, storage, and clinical annotation. She held the Sally S. Morley Designated Professorship/Chair at CWRU.

Barnholtz-Sloan joined the National Cancer Institute (NCI) in 2021, with a joint appointment as associate director for informatics and data science, in the center for biomedical informatics and information technology and senior investigator in the division of cancer epidemiology and genetics (DCEG). Her research portfolio includes descriptive epidemiology studies and etiologic investigations of brain tumors.

== See also ==
- List of women in statistics
- Women in computing
