= Motoo Kimura =

Japanese biologist (1924–1994)

Motoo Kimura ForMemRS
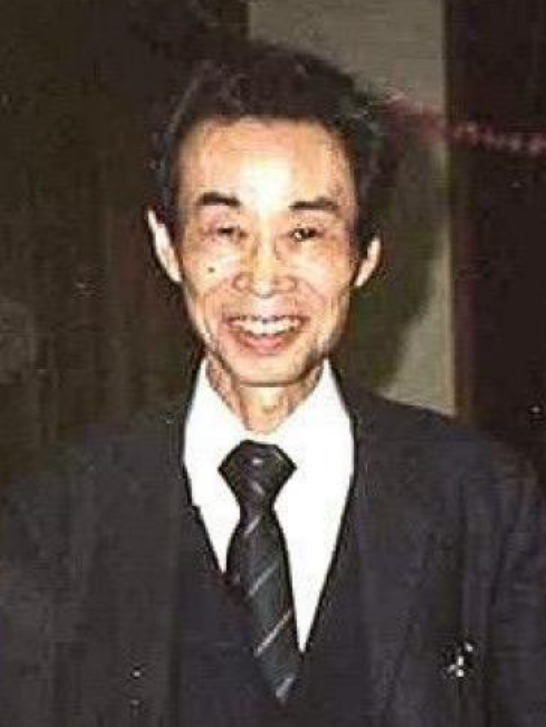
- Kimura in 1986
- Born: November 13, 1924; Okazaki, Japan
- Died: 13 November 1994 (aged 70); Mishima, Shizuoka, Japan
- Education: Kyoto Imperial University; University of Wisconsin
- Known for: Neutral theory of molecular evolution
- Spouse: Hiroko Kimura
- Children: 1
- Awards: Weldon Memorial Prize (1965); Asahi Prize (1986); John J. Carty Award (1987); International Prize for Biology (1988); Darwin Medal (1992)
- Scientific career
- Fields: Evolutionary biology; Population genetics
- Workplaces: National Institute of Genetics
- Thesis: Stochastic Processes in Population Genetics (1956)
- Doctoral advisor: James F. Crow
- Other academic advisors: Jay Laurence Lush; Hitoshi Kihara

Motoo Kimura (木村 資生, Kimura Motō) (November 13, 1924 – November 13, 1994) was a Japanese biologist best known for introducing the neutral theory of molecular evolution in 1968. He became one of the most influential theoretical population geneticists. He is remembered in genetics for his innovative use of diffusion equations to calculate the probability of fixation of beneficial, deleterious, or neutral alleles. Combining theoretical population genetics with molecular evolution data, he also developed the neutral theory of molecular evolution in which genetic drift is the main force changing allele frequencies. James Franklin Crow, himself a renowned population geneticist, considered Kimura to be one of the two greatest evolutionary geneticists, along with Gustave Malécot, after the great trio of the modern synthesis, Ronald Fisher, J. B. S. Haldane, and Sewall Wright.

== Life and work ==
Kimura was born on November 13, 1924, in Okazaki, Aichi Prefecture. From an early age he was very interested in botany, though he also excelled at mathematics (teaching himself geometry and other maths during a lengthy convalescence due to food poisoning). After entering a selective high school in Nagoya, Kimura focused on plant morphology and cytology; he worked in the laboratory of M. Kumazawa studying the chromosome structure of lilies. With Kumazawa, he also discovered how to connect his interests in botany and mathematics: biometry

Due to World War II, Kimura left high school early to enter Kyoto Imperial University in 1944. On the advice of the prominent geneticist Hitoshi Kihara, Kimura entered the botany program rather than cytology because the former, in the Faculty of Science rather than Agriculture, allowed him to avoid military duty. He joined Kihara's laboratory after the war, where he studied the introduction of foreign chromosomes into plants and learned the foundations of population genetics.

In 1949, Kimura joined the National Institute of Genetics in Mishima, Shizuoka. In 1953 he published his first population genetics paper (which would eventually be very influential), describing a "stepping stone" model for population structure that could treat more complex patterns of migration than Sewall Wright's earlier "island model". After meeting visiting American geneticist Duncan McDonald (part of the Atomic Bomb Casualty Commission), Kimura arranged to enter graduate school at Iowa State College in the summer 1953 to study with J. L. Lush.

Kimura soon found Iowa State College too restricting; he moved to the University of Wisconsin to work on stochastic models with James F. Crow and to join a strong intellectual community of like-minded geneticists, including Newton Morton and most significantly, Sewall Wright. Near the end of his graduate study, Kimura gave a paper at the 1955 Cold Spring Harbor Symposium; though few were able to understand it (both because of mathematical complexity and Kimura's English pronunciation) it received strong praise from Wright and later J.B.S. Haldane.

His accomplishments at Wisconsin included a general model for genetic drift, which could accommodate multiple alleles, selection, migration, and mutations, as well as some work based on R.A. Fisher's fundamental theorem of natural selection. He also built on the work of Wright with the Fokker–Planck equation by introducing the Kolmogorov backward equation to population genetics, allowing the calculation of the probability of an allele to become fixed in a population. He received his PhD in 1956, before returning to Japan (where he would remain for the rest of his life, at the National Institute of Genetics).

Kimura worked on a wide spectrum of theoretical population genetics problems, many of them in collaboration with Takeo Maruyama. He introduced the "infinite alleles", "infinite sites", and "stepwise" models of mutation, all of which would be used widely as the field of molecular evolution grew alongside the number of available peptide and genetic sequences. The stepwise mutation model is a "ladder model" that can be applied to electrophoresis studies where homologous proteins differ by whole units of charge. An early statement of his approach was published in 1960, in his An Introduction to Population Genetics. He also contributed an important review article on the ongoing controversy over genetic load in 1961.

1968 marked a turning point in Kimura's career. In that year he introduced the neutral theory of molecular evolution, the idea that, at the molecular level, the large majority of genetic change is neutral with respect to natural selection—making genetic drift a primary factor in evolution. The field of molecular biology was expanding rapidly, and there was growing tension between advocates of the expanding reductionist field and scientists in organismal biology, the traditional domain of evolution. The neutral theory was immediately controversial, receiving support from many molecular biologists and attracting opposition from many evolutionary biologists. The palaeontologist George Gaylord Simpson and the ornithologist Ernst Walter Mayr were particularly critical of neutral theory.

Kimura spent the rest of his life developing and defending the neutral theory. As James Crow put it, "much of Kimura's early work turned out to be pre-adapted for use in the quantitative study of neutral evolution". As new experimental techniques and genetic knowledge became available, Kimura expanded the scope of the neutral theory and created mathematical methods for testing it against the available evidence. Kimura produced a monograph on the neutral theory in 1983, The Neutral Theory of Molecular Evolution, and also worked to promote the theory through popular writings such as My Views on Evolution, a book that became a best-seller in Japan.

Though difficult to test against alternative selection-centered hypotheses, the neutral theory has become part of modern approaches to molecular evolution.

In 1992, Kimura received the Darwin Medal from the Royal Society, and the following year he was made a Foreign Member of the Royal Society.

Kimura suffered from progressive weakening caused by amyotrophic lateral sclerosis later in life. In an accidental fall at his home in Shizuoka, Japan, Kimura struck his head and died on November 13, 1994, of a cerebral hemorrhage. He was married to Hiroko Kimura. They had one child, a son, Akio, and a granddaughter, Hanako.

== Honors ==
- 1959 – Genetics Society of Japan Prize
- 1965 – Weldon Memorial Prize, Oxford
- 1968 – Japan Academy Prize
- 1973 – Foreign member of the National Academy of Sciences of the USA
- 1976 – Person of Cultural Merit
- 1976 – Order of Culture
- 1982 – Member of the Japan Academy
- 1986 – Chevalier de l'Ordre Nationale de Merite
- 1986 – Asahi Prize
- 1987 – John J. Carty Award of the National Academy of Sciences in evolutionary biology
- 1988 – International Prize for Biology
- 1992 – Darwin Medal
- 1993 – Foreign member of Royal Society

== See also ==
- History of biology
- History of evolutionary thought
- History of molecular biology
- Molecular evolution
