= Kenneth Kidd =

American geneticist

- Born: Kenneth Kay Kidd
- Education: Taft Union High School
- Alma mater: University of Wisconsin
- Known for: Population genetics Evolutionary genetics
- Awards: Biomedical paper of the Year award from the Lancet (2002); Fellow of the American Association for the Advancement of Science
- Scientific career
- Fields: Genetics
- Institutions: Yale University School of Medicine
- Thesis: Phylogenetic analysis of cattle breeds (1969)
- Doctoral advisor: William H. Stone
- Notable students: Sarah Tishkoff
- Website: medicine.yale.edu/profile/kenneth_kidd/

Kenneth Kay Kidd is an American human geneticist and emeritus professor of genetics at Yale University School of Medicine. He is known for his work on the role of genetics in disorders such as manic depression and schizophrenia, on human genetic variation and its relationship to geography, and the Out of Africa theory of human evolution. He also helped discover the DRD4-7R gene that has been linked to exploratory behaviour.

Kidd also did work on the forensic identification of individuals by single nucleotide polymorphisms and was a key figure in the 1990s Human Genome Diversity Project (HGDP), which indigenous populations rejected due to fear of exploitation of their genetic material, including for purposes other than medical research ("In the long history of destruction which has accompanied western colonization we have come to realize that the agenda of the non-indigenous forces has been to appropriate and manipulate the natural order for the purposes of profit, power, and control.").

== Uyghur genetic material controversy ==
In 2019, The New York Times alleged that Kidd's collected genetic material from Uyghurs was being used by "scientists affiliated with China's police" in order to create a genetic database of Uyghurs in China. The piece alleged that Kidd had visited China regularly since 1981, and met with at least one figure within the Ministry of Public Security (China). When contacted by The New York Times, Kidd claimed to have no knowledge of any potential uses of genetic material for these purposes. He has since asked the Chinese to remove genetic material provided from his work but received no response.
