= Neutral theory of molecular evolution =

Theory of evolution by changes at the molecular level

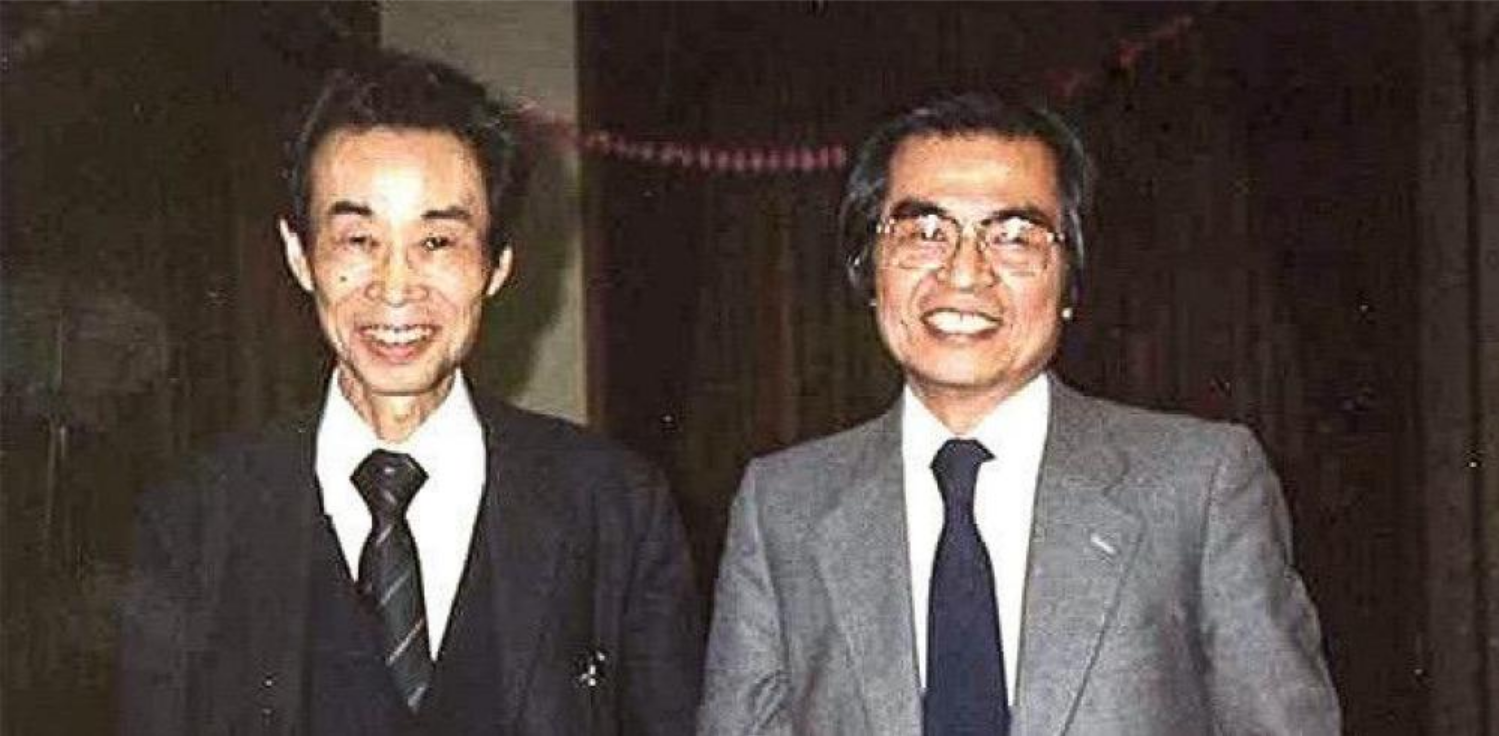
Motoo Kimura (left) and Masatoshi Nei, two central figures in the development of modern neutral evolutionary theory.

The neutral theory of evolution holds that most of the genetic variation within and between species is due to random genetic drift of mutant alleles that are selectively neutral. A neutral mutation is one that does not affect an organism's ability to survive and reproduce (its fitness).

Neutral alleles may have no observable phenotype or they may be responsible for phenotypic changes that have no effect on fitness. The neutral theory does not just apply to evolution at the molecular level.

The neutral theory recognizes that some alleles confer a beneficial phenotype and is compatible with some portion of evolution being shaped by natural selection as postulated by Charles Darwin.

The neutral theory allows for the possibility that some mutations are deleterious, but holds that because most of these are rapidly removed by natural selection, they do not usually make significant contributions to variation within and between species.

The neutral theory assumes that most alleles are neutral (about 95% of all de novo mutations that appear in every generation). A neutral allele can arise within a population and reach fixation by random genetic drift, rather than by selective advantage.

The theory was introduced by the Japanese biologist Motoo Kimura in 1968, and independently by two American biologists Jack Lester King and Thomas Hughes Jukes in 1969, and described in detail by Kimura in his 1983 monograph The Neutral Theory of Molecular Evolution. The proposal of the neutral theory was followed by an extensive "neutralist–selectionist" controversy over the interpretation of patterns of molecular divergence and gene polymorphism, peaking in the 1970s and 1980s.

Neutral theory is frequently used as the null hypothesis, as opposed to adaptive explanations, for describing the emergence of morphological or genetic features in organisms and populations. This has been suggested in a number of areas, including in explaining genetic variation between populations of one nominal species, the emergence of complex subcellular machinery, and the convergent emergence of several typical microbial morphologies.

== Origins ==
While some scientists, such as Freese (1962) and Freese and Yoshida (1965), had suggested that neutral mutations were probably widespread, the original mathematical derivation of the theory had been published by R.A. Fisher in 1930. Fisher, however, gave a reasoned argument for believing that, in practice, neutral gene substitutions would be very rare. A coherent theory of neutral evolution was first proposed by Motoo Kimura in 1968 and by King and Jukes independently in 1969. Kimura initially focused on differences among species; King and Jukes focused on differences within species.

Many molecular biologists and population geneticists also contributed to the development of the neutral theory. The principles of population genetics, established by J.B.S. Haldane, R.A. Fisher, and Sewall Wright, created a mathematical approach to analyzing gene frequencies that contributed to the development of Kimura's theory.

Haldane's dilemma regarding the cost of selection was used as motivation by Kimura. Haldane estimated that it takes about 300 generations for a beneficial mutation to become fixed in a mammalian lineage, meaning that the number of substitutions (1.5 per year) in the evolution between humans and chimpanzees was too high to be explained by beneficial mutations.

== Functional constraint ==
The neutral theory holds that as functional constraint diminishes, the probability that a mutation is neutral rises, and so should the rate of sequence divergence.

When comparing various proteins, extremely high evolutionary rates were observed in proteins such as fibrinopeptides and the C chain of the proinsulin molecule, which both have little to no functionality compared to their active molecules. Kimura and Ohta also estimated that the alpha and beta chains on the surface of a hemoglobin protein evolve at a rate almost ten times faster than the inside pockets, which would imply that the overall molecular structure of hemoglobin is less significant than the inside where the iron-containing heme groups reside.

There is evidence that rates of nucleotide substitution are particularly high in the third position of a codon, where there is little functional constraint. This view is based in part on the degenerate genetic code, in which sequences of three nucleotides (codons) may differ and yet encode the same amino acid (GCC and GCA both encode alanine, for example). Consequently, many potential single-nucleotide changes are in effect "silent" or "unexpressed" (see synonymous or silent substitution). Such changes are presumed to have little or no biological effect.

== Quantitative theory ==
Kimura also developed the infinite sites model (ISM) to provide insight into evolutionary rates of mutant alleles. If $v$ were to represent the rate of mutation of gametes per generation of $N$ individuals, each with two sets of chromosomes, the total number of new mutants in each generation is $2Nv$. Now let $k$ represent the evolution rate in terms of a mutant allele $\mu$ becoming fixed in a population.

$$k=2Nv\mu$$

According to ISM, selectively neutral mutations appear at rate $\mu$ in each of the $2N$ copies of a gene, and fix with probability $1/(2N)$. Because any of the $2N$ genes have the ability to become fixed in a population, $1/2N$ is equal to $\mu$, resulting in the rate of evolutionary rate equation:

$$k=v$$

The same math can be used on populations of speacies that have a different number of sets of chromosomes, but intead of 2N, we would use 1N, 3N, 4N, 5N...

This means that if all mutations were neutral, the rate at which fixed differences accumulate between divergent populations is predicted to be equal to the per-individual mutation rate, independent of population size. When the proportion of mutations that are neutral is constant, so is the divergence rate between populations. This provides a rationale for the molecular clock, which predated neutral theory. The ISM also demonstrates a constancy that is observed in molecular lineages.

This stochastic process is assumed to obey equations describing random genetic drift by means of accidents of sampling, rather than for example genetic hitchhiking of a neutral allele due to genetic linkage with non-neutral alleles. After appearing by mutation, a neutral allele may become more common within the population via genetic drift. Usually, it will be lost, or in rare cases it may become fixed, meaning that the new allele becomes standard in the population.

According to the neutral theory of molecular evolution, the amount of genetic variation within a species should be proportional to the effective population size.

== The "neutralist–selectionist" debate ==
A heated debate arose when Kimura's theory was published, largely revolving around the relative percentages of polymorphic and fixed alleles that are "neutral" versus "non-neutral".

A genetic polymorphism means that different forms of particular genes, and hence of the proteins that they produce, are co-existing within a species. Selectionists claimed that such polymorphisms are maintained by balancing selection, while neutralists view the variation of a protein as a transient phase of molecular evolution. Studies by Richard K. Koehn and W. F. Eanes demonstrated a correlation between polymorphism and molecular weight of their molecular subunits. This is consistent with the neutral theory assumption that larger subunits should have higher rates of neutral mutation. Selectionists, on the other hand, contribute environmental conditions to be the major determinants of polymorphisms rather than structural and functional factors.

According to the neutral theory of molecular evolution, the amount of genetic variation within a species should be proportional to the effective population size. Levels of genetic diversity vary much less than census population sizes, giving rise to the "paradox of variation" . While high levels of genetic diversity were one of the original arguments in favor of neutral theory, the paradox of variation has been one of the strongest arguments against neutral theory.

There are a large number of statistical methods for testing whether neutral theory is a good description of evolution (e.g., McDonald-Kreitman test), and many authors claimed detection of selection. Some researchers have nevertheless argued that the neutral theory still stands, while expanding the definition of neutral theory to include background selection at linked sites.

== Nearly neutral theory ==
Tomoko Ohta also emphasized the importance of nearly neutral mutations, in particularly slightly deleterious mutations. The Nearly neutral theory stems from the prediction of neutral theory that the balance between selection and genetic drift depends on effective population size. Nearly neutral mutations are those that carry selection coefficients less than the inverse of twice the effective population size. The population dynamics of nearly neutral mutations are only slightly different from those of neutral mutations unless the absolute magnitude of the selection coefficient is greater than 1/N, where N is the effective population size in respect of selection. The effective population size affects whether slightly deleterious mutations can be treated as neutral or as deleterious. In large populations, selection can decrease the frequency of slightly deleterious mutations, therefore acting as if they are deleterious. However, in small populations, genetic drift can more easily overcome selection, causing slightly deleterious mutations to act as if they are neutral and drift to fixation or loss.

== Constructive neutral evolution ==
The groundworks for the theory of constructive neutral evolution (CNE) was laid by two papers in the 1990s. Constructive neutral evolution is a theory which suggests that complex structures and processes can emerge through neutral transitions. Although a separate theory altogether, the emphasis on neutrality as a process whereby neutral alleles are randomly fixed by genetic drift finds some inspiration from the earlier attempt by the neutral theory to invoke its importance in evolution. Conceptually, there are two components A and B (which may represent two proteins) which interact with each other. A, which performs a function for the system, does not depend on its interaction with B for its functionality, and the interaction itself may have randomly arisen in an individual with the ability to disappear without an effect on the fitness of A. This present yet currently unnecessary interaction is therefore called an "excess capacity" of the system. However, a mutation may occur which compromises the ability of A to perform its function independently. However, the A:B interaction that has already emerged sustains the capacity of A to perform its initial function. Therefore, the emergence of the A:B interaction "presuppresses" the deleterious nature of the mutation, making it a neutral change in the genome that is capable of spreading through the population via random genetic drift. Hence, A has gained a dependency on its interaction with B. In this case, the loss of B or the A:B interaction would have a negative effect on fitness and so purifying selection would eliminate individuals where this occurs. While each of these steps are individually reversible (for example, A may regain the capacity to function independently or the A:B interaction may be lost), a random sequence of mutations tends to further reduce the capacity of A to function independently and a random walk through the dependency space may very well result in a configuration in which a return to functional independence of A is far too unlikely to occur, which makes CNE a one-directional or "ratchet-like" process. CNE, which does not invoke adaptationist mechanisms for the origins of more complex systems (which involve more parts and interactions contributing to the whole), has seen application in the understanding of the evolutionary origins of the spliceosomal eukaryotic complex, RNA editing, additional ribosomal proteins beyond the core, the emergence of long-noncoding RNA from junk DNA, and so forth. In some cases, ancestral sequence reconstruction techniques have afforded the ability for experimental demonstration of some proposed examples of CNE, as in heterooligomeric ring protein complexes in some fungal lineages.

CNE has also been put forwards as the null hypothesis for explaining complex structures, and thus adaptationist explanations for the emergence of complexity must be rigorously tested on a case-by-case basis against this null hypothesis prior to acceptance. Grounds for invoking CNE as a null include that it does not presume that changes offered an adaptive benefit to the host or that they were directionally selected for, while maintaining the importance of more rigorous demonstrations of adaptation when invoked so as to avoid the excessive flaws of adaptationism criticized by Gould and Lewontin.

== Empirical evidence for the neutral theory ==
Predictions derived from the neutral theory are generally supported in studies of molecular evolution. One of the corollaries of the neutral theory is that the efficiency of positive selection is higher in populations or species with higher effective population sizes. This relationship between the effective population size and selection efficiency was evidenced by genomic studies of species including chimpanzee and human and domesticated species. In small populations (e.g., a population bottleneck during a speciation event), slightly deleterious mutations should accumulate. Data from various species supports this prediction in that the ratio of nonsynonymous to synonymous nucleotide substitutions between species generally exceeds that within species. In addition, nucleotide and amino acid substitutions generally accumulate over time in a linear fashion, which is consistent with neutral theory. Arguments against the neutral theory cite evidence of widespread positive selection and selective sweeps in genomic data. Empirical support for the neutral theory may vary depending on the type of genomic data studied and the statistical tools used to detect positive selection. For example, Bayesian methods for the detection of selected codon sites and McDonald-Kreitman tests have been criticized for their rate of erroneous identification of positive selection.

== See also ==
- Adaptive evolution in the human genome
- Coalescent theory
- Evolution of biological complexity
- Masatoshi Nei
- Molecular evolution
- Tomoko Ohta
- Unified neutral theory of biodiversity
