= The Neutral Theory of Molecular Evolution =

- Author: Motoo Kimura

The Neutral Theory of Molecular Evolution is an influential monograph written in 1983 by Japanese evolutionary biologist Motoo Kimura. While the neutral theory of molecular evolution existed since his article in 1968, Kimura felt the need to write a monograph with up-to-date information and evidences showing the importance of his theory in evolution.

Evolution is a change in the frequency of alleles in a population over time. Mutations occur at random and in the Darwinian evolution model natural selection acts on the genetic variation in a population that has arisen through this mutation. These mutations can be beneficial or deleterious and are selected for or against based on that factor. In this theory, every evolutionary event, mutation, and gene polymorphism (neutral differences in phenotype or genotype) would have to be positively or negatively selected for and show some kind of change over many generations. If these genetic differences grow between different populations speciation events can occur. When this theory was first introduced to the scientific community, there was no understanding of genetic principles such as drift or synonymous mutation.

When molecular biologists, like Motoo Kimura (1979), began to examine the DNA evidence, they found that far more mutations occur in non-protein coding regions or are synonymous mutations in coding regions (which do not change the protein structure or function) and are, therefore, not involved in selection as they do not impact an organism's fitness. These findings began to show that the positive or negative selection in Darwinian evolution was too simplistic to describe every evolutionary process. Through various experiments Kimura was able to determine that proteins in mammalian lineages were polymorphisms of each other, having only one or two point mutations that did not affect the actions of the protein in any way, whereas in Darwinian evolution a slow pattern of selection in genetic lineages with increasing fitness through generations is expected. The molecular evidence showed that DNA changes more often than what was originally expected and no real pattern was found. Polymorphisms in proteins that have no effect to the function are neutral or nearly neutral and do not get selected for or against at all. This theory would mean that each change in DNA that is passed on to the next generation does not result in a morphological change that can be acted upon by natural selection.

Genetic drift, or the result of a limited population size, can also cause a change in allele frequencies over time that can look like Darwinian evolution while actually being an entirely random or as Kimura puts it "neutral" process. In this scenario a relatively small population can lose neutral alleles through the random deaths or migrations of individuals that have them. It may appear to an onlooker that one trait is being selected for over another but in actuality it is a neutral process that is not necessarily undergoing selection as it would in Darwinian evolution.

== Neutral theory in research ==
=== Selective constraint in mammalian genes ===
Within the neutral theory, selective constraint is a type of negative selection that can occur in populations. When selective constraint is reached at a locus negative selection becomes so small that it is effectively neutral. This concept (also brought to prominence by Motoo Kimura (1979) in his expansion of the Neutral Theory of Molecular Evolution (1979) has been put to use in work concerning mammalian genes. In a study done by Price and Graur in 2015, the pair tried to find evidence on whether genes in primates and rodents were either undergoing Darwinian selection or were neutrally evolving under Kimura's model. The number of guanine/cytosine base pairs were utilized in pseudogenes that mimicked nonsynonymous and synonymous mutations that began at what would be expected in a truly neutrally evolving genome for both rodents and primates. Their findings showed that in rodents, the pseudogenes were evolving as one would expect under neutral conditions whereas in primates purifying selection was having an effect on as many as 20% of the pseudogenes tested. By these estimates in primates, 20-40% of their genes could be under selective constraint in the neutral model.

== Content ==
1. From Lamarck to population genetics
2. Overdevelopment of the synthetic theory and the proposal of the neutral theory
3. The neutral mutation-random drift hypothesis as an evolutionary paradigm
4. Molecular evolutionary rates contrasted with phenotypic evolutionary rates
5. Some features of molecular evolution
6. Definition, types and action of natural selection
7. Molecular structure, selective constraint and the rate of evolution
8. Population genetics at the molecular level
9. Summary and conclusion

== See also ==
- Molecular evolution
- Molecular clock
- Population genetics
