= Martin Kreitman =

American geneticist

- Education: Harvard University (PhD); University of Florida; Stony Brook University (undergraduate)
- Known for: McDonald–Kreitman test
- Awards: MacArthur Fellows Program (1991)
- Scientific career
- Institutions: University of Chicago; Harvard University; Stony Brook University; University of Florida
- Thesis: Nucleotide Sequence Variation of Alcohol dehydrogenase in Drosophila melanogaster (1983)
- Doctoral advisor: Richard Lewontin
- Website: profiles.uchicago.edu/profiles/display/37843

Martin Edward Kreitman is an American geneticist at the University of Chicago, most well known for the McDonald–Kreitman test that is used to infer the amount of adaptive evolution in population genetic studies.

== Education ==
Kreitman graduated from Stony Brook University with a Bachelor of Science degree Biology in 1975, and from the University of Florida with a Master of Science degree in Zoology, in 1977. He went on to study at Harvard University, graduating with a Ph.D. in Population Genetics, specifically Nucleotide Sequence Variation of Alcohol dehydrogenase in Drosophila melanogaster in 1983.

== Research ==
The Kreitman lab does research in four main areas:

"Functional evolution of cis-regulatory sequences (Drosophila)"

"Molecular population genetics and evolution (Drosophila and Arabidopsis)"

"Canalization in development and evolution (Drosophila)"

"Evolutionary dynamics of disease resistance and pathogenicity (Arabidopsis)"

== Awards and honors ==
- 1991 MacArthur Fellows Program
- editor-in-chief of "Journal of Molecular Evolution" from 1999
- Section head of the "Evolutionary/Comparative Genetics" part of Faculty of 1000 biology
- 2010 named fellow of the American Academy of Arts and Sciences

== Recent publications ==
- Ludwig, M. Z.; Manu; Kittler, R.; White, K. P.; Kreitman, M. (2011). Malik, Harmit S (ed.). "Consequences of Eukaryotic Enhancer Architecture for Gene Expression Dynamics, Development, and Fitness". PLOS Genetics. 7 (11) e1002364. doi:10.1371/journal.pgen.1002364. PMC 3213169. PMID 22102826.
- He, B. Z.; Holloway, A. K.; Maerkl, S. J.; Kreitman, M. (2011). Petrov, Dmitri A (ed.). "Does Positive Selection Drive Transcription Factor Binding Site Turnover? A Test with Drosophila Cis-Regulatory Modules". PLOS Genetics. 7 (4) e1002053. doi:10.1371/journal.pgen.1002053. PMC 3084208. PMID 21572512.
- Lott, S. E.; Ludwig, M. Z.; Kreitman, M. (2011). "Evolution and Inheritance of Early Embryonic Patterning in Drosophila Simulans and D. Sechellia". Evolution. 65 (5): 1388–1399. doi:10.1111/j.1558-5646.2010.01206.x. PMC 3083464. PMID 21121913.
- Bakker, E. G.; Traw, M. B.; Toomajian, C.; Kreitman, M.; Bergelson, J. (2008). "Low Levels of Polymorphism in Genes That Control the Activation of Defense Response in Arabidopsis thaliana". Genetics. 178 (4): 2031–2043. doi:10.1534/genetics.107.083279. PMC 2323794. PMID 18245336.
- Araki, H.; Innan, H.; Kreitman, M.; Bergelson, J. (2007). "Molecular Evolution of Pathogenicity-Island Genes in Pseudomonas viridiflava". Genetics. 177 (2): 1031–1041. doi:10.1534/genetics.107.077925. PMC 2034611. PMID 17720907.
- Lott, S. E.; Kreitman, M.; Palsson, A.; Alekseeva, E.; Ludwig, M. Z. (2007). "Canalization of segmentation and its evolution in Drosophila". Proceedings of the National Academy of Sciences. 104 (26): 10926–10931. Bibcode:2007PNAS..10410926L. doi:10.1073/pnas.0701359104. PMC 1891814. PMID 17569783.
- Bakker, E. G. (2006). "A Genome-Wide Survey of R Gene Polymorphisms in Arabidopsis". The Plant Cell Online. 18 (8): 1803–1818. Bibcode:2006PlanC..18.1803B. doi:10.1105/tpc.106.042614. PMC 1533970. PMID 16798885.
- Bakker, E. G.; Stahl, E. A.; Toomajian, C.; Nordborg, M.; Kreitman, M.; Bergelson, J. (2006). "Distribution of genetic variation within and among local populations of Arabidopsis thaliana over its species range". Molecular Ecology. 15 (5): 1405–1418. Bibcode:2006MolEc..15.1405B. doi:10.1111/j.1365-294X.2006.02884.x. PMID 16626462. S2CID 2070755.
- Araki, H. (2006). "Presence/absence polymorphism for alternative pathogenicity islands in Pseudomonas viridiflava, a pathogen of Arabidopsis". Proceedings of the National Academy of Sciences. 103 (15): 5887–5892. Bibcode:2006PNAS..103.5887A. doi:10.1073/pnas.0601431103. PMC 1458668. PMID 16581904.
- Nordborg, M.; Hu, T. T.; Ishino, Y.; Jhaveri, J.; Toomajian, C.; Zheng, H.; Bakker, E.; Calabrese, P.; Gladstone, J.; Goyal, R.; Jakobsson, M.; Kim, S.; Morozov, Y.; Padhukasahasram, B.; Plagnol, V.; Rosenberg, N. A.; Shah, C.; Wall, J. D.; Wang, J.; Zhao, K.; Kalbfleisch, T.; Schulz, V.; Kreitman, M.; Bergelson, J. (2005). "The Pattern of Polymorphism in Arabidopsis thaliana". PLOS Biology. 3 (7) e196. doi:10.1371/journal.pbio.0030196. PMC 1135296. PMID 15907155.
- Ludwig, M. Z.; Palsson, A.; Alekseeva, E.; Bergman, C. M.; Nathan, J.; Kreitman, M. (2005). "Functional Evolution of a cis-Regulatory Module". PLOS Biology. 3 (4) e93. doi:10.1371/journal.pbio.0030093. PMC 1064851. PMID 15757364.
- Kreitman, M.; Di Rienzo, A. (2004). "Balancing claims for balancing selection". Trends in Genetics. 20 (7): 300–304. doi:10.1016/j.tig.2004.05.002. PMID 15219394.
- Goss, E. M.; Kreitman, M.; Bergelson, J. (2004). "Genetic Diversity, Recombination and Cryptic Clades in Pseudomonas viridiflava Infecting Natural Populations of Arabidopsis thaliana". Genetics. 169 (1): 21–35. doi:10.1534/genetics.104.031351. PMC 1448860. PMID 15489535.
- Mauricio, R.; Stahl, E. A.; Korves, T.; Tian, D.; Kreitman, M.; Bergelson, J. (2003). "Natural selection for polymorphism in the disease resistance gene Rps2 of Arabidopsis thaliana". Genetics. 163 (2): 735–746. doi:10.1093/genetics/163.2.735. PMC 1462445. PMID 12618410.
- Tian, D.; Traw, M. B.; Chen, J. Q.; Kreitman, M.; Bergelson, J. (2003). "Fitness costs of R-gene-mediated resistance in Arabidopsis thaliana". Nature. 423 (6935): 74–77. Bibcode:2003Natur.423...74T. doi:10.1038/nature01588. PMID 12721627. S2CID 4394776.
- Toomajian, C.; Ajioka, R. S.; Jorde, L. B.; Kushner, J. P.; Kreitman, M. (2003). "A method for detecting recent selection in the human genome from allele age estimates". Genetics. 165 (1): 287–297. doi:10.1093/genetics/165.1.287. PMC 1462736. PMID 14504236.
- Tian, D. (2002). "Signature of balancing selection in Arabidopsis". Proceedings of the National Academy of Sciences. 99 (17): 11525–11530. Bibcode:2002PNAS...9911525T. doi:10.1073/pnas.172203599. PMC 123289. PMID 12172007.
- Toomajian, C.; Kreitman, M. (2002). "Sequence variation and haplotype structure at the human HFE locus". Genetics. 161 (4): 1609–1623. doi:10.1093/genetics/161.4.1609. PMC 1462210. PMID 12196404.
- Jakob, K.; Goss, E. M.; Araki, H.; Van, T.; Kreitman, M.; Bergelson, J. (2002). "Pseudomonas viridiflavaandP. Syringae—Natural Pathogens ofArabidopsis thaliana". Molecular Plant-Microbe Interactions. 15 (12): 1195–1203. Bibcode:2002MPMI...15.1195J. doi:10.1094/MPMI.2002.15.12.1195. PMID 12481991.
- Comeron, J. M.; Kreitman, M. (2002). "Population, evolutionary and genomic consequences of interference selection". Genetics. 161 (1): 389–410. doi:10.1093/genetics/161.1.389. PMC 1462104. PMID 12019253.
- Nordborg, M.; Borevitz, J. O.; Bergelson, J.; Berry, C. C.; Chory, J.; Hagenblad, J.; Kreitman, M.; Maloof, J. N.; Noyes, T.; Oefner, P. J.; Stahl, E. A.; Weigel, D. (2002). "The extent of linkage disequilibrium in Arabidopsis thaliana". Nature Genetics. 30 (2): 190–193. doi:10.1038/ng813. PMID 11780140. S2CID 29420110.
- Bergman, C. M.; Kreitman, M. (2001). "Analysis of Conserved Noncoding DNA in Drosophila Reveals Similar Constraints in Intergenic and Intronic Sequences". Genome Research. 11 (8): 1335–1345. doi:10.1101/gr.178701. PMID 11483574.
- Bergelson, J.; Kreitman, M.; Stahl, E. A.; Tian, D. (2001). "Evolutionary Dynamics of Plant R-Genes". Science. 292 (5525): 2281–2285. doi:10.1126/science.1061337. PMID 11423651. S2CID 21638017.
- Comeron, J. M.; Kreitman, M. (2000). "The correlation between intron length and recombination in drosophila. Dynamic equilibrium between mutational and selective forces". Genetics. 156 (3): 1175–1190. doi:10.1093/genetics/156.3.1175. PMC 1461334. PMID 11063693.
- Ludwig, M. Z.; Bergman, C.; Patel, N. H.; Kreitman, M. (2000). "Evidence for stabilizing selection in a eukaryotic enhancer element". Nature. 403 (6769): 564–567. Bibcode:2000Natur.403..564L. doi:10.1038/35000615. PMID 10676967. S2CID 4425113.
- Bergelson, J.; Stahl, E. A.; Dwyer, G.; Mauricio, R.; Kreitman, M. (1999). "Dynamics of disease resistance polymorphism at the Rpm1 locus of Arabidopsis". Nature. 400 (6745): 667–671. Bibcode:1999Natur.400..667S. doi:10.1038/23260. PMID 10458161. S2CID 4380447.
- Comeron, J. M.; Kreitman, M.; Aguadé, M. (1999). "Natural selection on synonymous sites is correlated with gene length and recombination in Drosophila". Genetics. 151 (1): 239–249. doi:10.1093/genetics/151.1.239. PMC 1460462. PMID 9872963.
- Ludwig, M. Z.; Patel, N. H.; Kreitman, M. (1998). "Functional analysis of eve stripe 2 enhancer evolution in Drosophila: Rules governing conservation and change". Development. 125 (5): 949–958. doi:10.1242/dev.125.5.949. PMID 9449677.
