= Fluctuating selection =

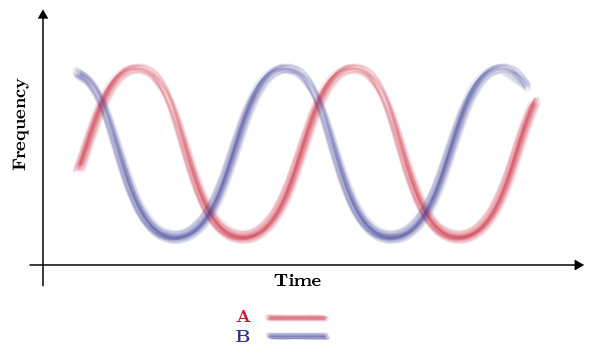
Alleles A and B fluctuate in adaptive value over time

Fluctuating selection is a mode of natural selection characterized by the fluctuation of the direction of selection on a given phenotype over a relatively brief period of evolutionary time. For example, a species of plant may come in two varieties: one which prefers wetter soil and one which prefers dryer soil. During a period of wet years, the wet variety will be more fit and produce more offspring, and thereby increase the frequency of wet-preferring plants. If this wet period is followed by drought, the dry variety will be selected for and its numbers will increase. As periods of dryness and wetness fluctuate, so too does selection on dry-preferring and wet-preferring plants. Fluctuating selection is also manifest at the genic level. Consider two alleles, A and B, which are found at the same locus. Fluctuating selection dynamics are at play when selection favors A at time t_{0}, B at t_{1} and A again at t_{2}.

Fluctuating selection has been characterized by several mathematical models. Under some circumstances, fluctuating selection may lead to a balanced polymorphism. When two species exert selection on one another, e.g. a host and its parasite, this can lead to fluctuating selection dynamics.

== Red Queen dynamics and the maintenance of sex ==
The Red Queen hypothesis describes coevolutionary 'arms races' between antagonistic species (predators and prey, parasites and hosts, competitors with overlapping niches), emphasizing competition between species and populations rather than within them. Under Red Queen dynamics, a species must adapt to shifting selection pressures of the ever-changing biota which constitute its environment or face extinction. Experiments in Red Queen environments on real and simulated populations have offered strong support for the maintenance of sexual reproduction despite the two-fold cost of sex.

Fluctuating selection may also play an important role in host-parasite coevolutionary relationships, specifically in the maintenance of sex. It has been shown that coevolutionary arms race dynamics between host and parasite give way to fluctuating selection dynamics in a minimal environment. Fluctuating selection in Red Queen environments has been suggested as an explanation for the persistence of sex:

The essence of sex in our theory is that it stores genes that are currently bad but have promise for reuse. It continually tries them in combination, waiting for the time when the focus of disadvantage has moved elsewhere. When this has happened, the genotypes carrying such genes spread by successful reproduction, becoming simultaneously stores for other bad genes and thus onward in continuous succession.

In this conception of sex, the population is a storehouse of variation and sex is a mechanism for distributing old, minority variants once they become useful. This theory depends on fluctuating selection, as fluctuating selection dynamics make adaptive previously maladaptive variants due to ecological shifts.

== See also ==
- Frequency-dependent selection
- Directional selection
- Balancing selection
- Disruptive selection
- Negative selection (natural selection)
- Stabilizing selection
