= Negative selection (natural selection) =

Selective removal of alleles that are deleterious

In natural selection, negative selection or purifying selection is the selective removal of alleles that are deleterious. This can result in stabilising selection through the purging of deleterious genetic polymorphisms that arise through random mutations.

== Mechanism ==
Purging of deleterious alleles can be achieved on the population genetics level, with as little as a single point mutation being the unit of selection. In such a case, carriers of the harmful point mutation have fewer offspring each generation, reducing the frequency of the mutation in the gene pool.

In the case of strong negative selection on a locus, the purging of deleterious variants will result in the occasional removal of linked variation, producing a decrease in the level of variation surrounding the locus under selection. The incidental purging of non-deleterious alleles due to such spatial proximity to deleterious alleles is called background selection. This effect increases with lower mutation rate but decreases with higher recombination rate.

Purifying selection can be split into purging by non-random mating (assortative mating) and purging by genetic drift. Purging by genetic drift can remove primarily deeply recessive alleles, whereas natural selection can remove any type of deleterious alleles.

Purifying selection on a given gene weakens when that gene's importance to an individual's reproductive fitness diminishes. For example, purifying selection of genes regulating homeostatic processes late in the life history of African killfishes greatly decreases in arid environments with high extrinsic mortality rates. This is because the late-life phenotypes these genes produce seldom actually manifest to be subject to purifying selection because most individuals in such harsh environments do not live long enough for the genes to take effect.

== Negative selection in haploid compared to diploid tissue ==
The idea that those genes of an organism that are expressed in the haploid stage are under more efficient natural selection than those genes expressed exclusively in the diploid stage is referred to as the “masking theory”. This theory implies that purifying selection is more efficient in the haploid stage of the life cycle where fitness effects are more fully expressed than in the diploid stage of the life cycle. Evidence supporting the masking theory has been reported in the single-celled yeast Saccharomyces cerevisiae. Further evidence of strong purifying selection in haploid tissue-specific genes, in support of the masking theory, has been reported for the plant, Scots Pine.

== See also ==
- Assortative mating
- Balancing selection
- Directional selection
- Disruptive selection
- Dysgenics
- Fluctuating selection
- Genetic purging
- Koinophilia
- Mutation–selection balance
- Stabilizing selection
