= Disruptive selection =

Natural selection for extreme trait values over intermediate ones

These charts depict the different types of genetic selection. On each graph, the x-axis variable is the type of phenotypic trait and the y-axis variable is the amount of organisms. Group A is the original population and Group B is the population after selection. Graph 1 shows directional selection, in which a single extreme phenotype is favored. Graph 2 depicts stabilizing selection, where the intermediate phenotype is favored over the extreme traits. Graph 3 shows disruptive selection, in which the extreme phenotypes are favored over the intermediate.

In evolutionary biology, disruptive selection, also called diversifying selection, describes changes in population genetics in which extreme values for a trait are favored over intermediate values. In this case, the variance of the trait increases and the population is divided into two distinct groups. In this more individuals acquire peripheral character value at both ends of the distribution curve.

== Overview ==
Natural selection is known to be one of the most important biological processes behind evolution. There are many variations of traits, and some cause greater or lesser reproductive success of the individual. The effect of selection is to promote certain alleles, traits, and individuals that have a higher chance to survive and reproduce in their specific environment. Since the environment has a carrying capacity, nature acts on this mode of selection on individuals to let only the most fit offspring survive and reproduce to their full potential. The more advantageous the trait is the more common it will become in the population. Disruptive selection is a specific type of natural selection that actively selects against the intermediate in a population, favoring both extremes of the spectrum.

Disruptive selection is inferred to oftentimes lead to sympatric speciation through a phyletic gradualism mode of evolution. Disruptive selection can be caused or influenced by multiple factors and also have multiple outcomes, in addition to speciation. Individuals within the same environment can develop a preference for extremes of a trait, against the intermediate. Selection can act on having divergent body morphologies in accessing food, such as beak and dental structure. It is seen that often this is more prevalent in environments where there is not a wide clinal range of resources, causing heterozygote disadvantage or selection favoring homozygotes.

Niche partitioning allows for selection of differential patterns of resource usage, which can drive speciation. To the contrast, niche conservation pulls individuals toward ancestral ecological traits in an evolutionary tug-of-war. Also, nature tends to have a 'jump on the band wagon' perspective when something beneficial is found. This can lead to the opposite occurring with disruptive selection eventually selecting against the average; when everyone starts taking advantage of that resource it will become depleted and the extremes will be favored. Furthermore, gradualism is a more realistic view when looking at speciation as compared to punctuated equilibrium.

Disruptive selection can initially rapidly intensify divergence; this is because it is only manipulating alleles that already exist. Often it is not creating new ones by mutation which takes a long time. Usually complete reproductive isolation does not occur until many generations, but behavioral or morphological differences separate the species from reproducing generally. Furthermore, generally hybrids have reduced fitness which promotes reproductive isolation.

== Example ==
Suppose there is a population of rabbits. The colour of the rabbits is governed by two incompletely dominant traits: black fur, represented by "B", and white fur, represented by "b". A rabbit in this population with a genotype of "BB" would have a phenotype of black fur, a genotype of "Bb" would have grey fur (Incomplete Dominance), and a genotype of "bb" would have white fur.

If this population of rabbits occurred in an environment that had areas of black rocks as well as areas of white rocks, the rabbits with black fur would be able to hide from predators amongst the black rocks, and the rabbits with white fur likewise amongst the white rocks. The rabbits with grey fur, however, would stand out in all areas of the habitat, and would thereby suffer greater predation.

As a consequence of this type of selective pressure, our hypothetical rabbit population would be disruptively selected for extreme values of the fur colour trait: white or black, but not grey. This is an example of underdominance (heterozygote disadvantage) leading to disruptive selection.

== Sympatric speciation ==
It is believed that disruptive selection is one of the main forces that drive sympatric speciation in natural populations. The pathways that lead from disruptive selection to sympatric speciation seldom are prone to deviation; such speciation is a domino effect that depends on the consistency of each distinct variable. These pathways are the result of disruptive selection in intraspecific competition; it may cause reproductive isolation, and finally culminate in sympatric speciation.

It is important to keep in mind that disruptive selection does not always have to be based on intraspecific competition. It is also important to know that this type of natural selection is similar to the other ones. Where it is not the major factor, intraspecific competition can be discounted in assessing the operative aspects of the course of adaptation. For example, what may drive disruptive selection instead of intraspecific competition might be polymorphisms that lead to reproductive isolation, and thence to speciation.

When disruptive selection is based on intraspecific competition, the resulting selection in turn promotes ecological niche diversification and polymorphisms. If multiple morphs (phenotypic forms) occupy different niches, such separation could be expected to promote reduced competition for resources. Disruptive selection is seen more often in high density populations rather than in low density populations because intraspecific competition tends to be more intense within higher density populations. This is because higher density populations often imply more competition for resources. The resulting competition drives polymorphisms to exploit different niches or changes in niches in order to avoid competition. If one morph has no need for resources used by another morph, then it is likely that neither would experience pressure to compete or interact, thereby supporting the persistence and possibly the intensification of the distinctness of the two morphs within the population. This theory does not necessarily have a lot of supporting evidence in natural populations, but it has been seen many times in experimental situations using existing populations. These experiments further support that, under the right situations (as described above), this theory could prove to be true in nature.

When intraspecific competition is not at work disruptive selection can still lead to sympatric speciation and it does this through maintaining polymorphisms. Once the polymorphisms are maintained in the population, if assortative mating is taking place, then this is one way that disruptive selection can lead in the direction of sympatric speciation. If different morphs have different mating preferences then assortative mating can occur, especially if the polymorphic trait is a "magic trait", meaning a trait that is under ecological selection and in turn has a side effect on reproductive behavior. In a situation where the polymorphic trait is not a magic trait then there has to be some kind of fitness penalty for those individuals who do not mate assortatively and a mechanism that causes assortative mating has to evolve in the population. For example, if a species of butterflies develops two kinds of wing patterns, crucial to mimicry purposes in their preferred habitat, then mating between two butterflies of different wing patterns leads to an unfavorable heterozygote. Therefore, butterflies will tend to mate with others of the same wing pattern promoting increased fitness, eventually eliminating the heterozygote altogether. This unfavorable heterozygote generates pressure for a mechanism that cause assortative mating which will then lead to reproductive isolation due to the production of post-mating barriers. It is actually fairly common to see sympatric speciation when disruptive selection is supporting two morphs, specifically when the phenotypic trait affects fitness rather than mate choice.

In both situations, one where intraspecific competition is at work and the other where it is not, if all these factors are in place, they will lead to reproductive isolation, which can lead to sympatric speciation.

== Other outcomes ==
- polymorphism
- sexual dimorphism
- phenotypic plasticity

== Significance ==
Disruptive selection is of particular significance in the history of evolutionary study, as it is involved in one of evolution's "cardinal cases", namely the finch populations observed by Darwin in the Galápagos. He observed that the species of finches were similar enough to ostensibly have been descended from a single species. However, they exhibited disruptive variation in beak size. This variation appeared to be adaptively related to the seed size available on the respective islands (big beaks for big seeds, small beaks for small seeds). Medium beaks had difficulty retrieving small seeds and were also not tough enough for the bigger seeds, and were hence maladaptive.

While it is true that disruptive selection can lead to speciation, this is not as quick or straightforward of a process as other types of speciation or evolutionary change. This introduces the topic of gradualism, which is a slow but continuous accumulation of changes over long periods of time. This is largely because the results of disruptive selection are less stable than the results of directional selection (directional selection favors individuals at only one end of the spectrum).

For example, let us take the mathematically straightforward yet biologically improbable case of the rabbits: Suppose directional selection were taking place. The field only has dark rocks in it, so the darker the rabbit, the more effectively it can hide from predators. Eventually there will be a lot of black rabbits in the population (hence many "B" alleles) and a lesser amount of grey rabbits (who contribute 50% chromosomes with "B" allele and 50% chromosomes with "b" allele to the population). There will be few white rabbits (not very many contributors of chromosomes with "b" allele to the population). This could eventually lead to a situation in which chromosomes with "b" allele die out, making black the only possible color for all subsequent rabbits. The reason for this is that there is nothing "boosting" the level of "b" chromosomes in the population. They can only go down, and eventually die out.

Consider now the case of disruptive selection. The result is equal numbers of black and white rabbits, and hence equal numbers of chromosomes with "B" or "b" allele, still floating around in that population. Every time a white rabbit mates with a black one, only gray rabbits results. So, in order for the results to "click", there needs to be a force causing white rabbits to choose other white rabbits, and black rabbits to choose other black ones. In the case of the finches, this "force" was geographic/niche isolation. This leads one to think that disruptive selection cannot happen and is normally because of species being geographically isolated, directional selection or by stabilising selection.

== See also ==
- Character displacement
- Balancing selection
- Directional selection
- Negative selection (natural selection)
- Stabilizing selection
- Sympatric speciation
- Fluctuating selection
- Selection
