= Directional selection =

Type of genetic selection favoring one extreme phenotype

Frequency shifts in populations as a result of three types of selection pressures. The red lines on each graph represent the frequency distribution of the original population phenotypes and the blue lines show the frequencies after directional selection (Graph 1), after stabilizing selection (Graph 2) and after disruptive selection (Graph 3).

In population genetics, directional selection is a mode of natural selection in which individuals with a trait (for example, beak size) at one extreme of a phenotypic distribution have better fitness than individuals with intermediate or opposite extreme phenotypes. Over time, the allele frequencies, and consequently the population mean for the trait, shift consistently in the direction of the extreme phenotype with greater fitness. An example is the evolution of antibiotic resistance in bacteria – the introduction of a strong selective pressure (the antibiotic) selects resistant strains of bacteria, thereby shifting allele frequencies toward phenotypes with strong resistance to the antibiotic.

This type of selection plays an important role in the emergence of complex and diversifying traits and is also a primary force in speciation. Natural phenomena that might promote strong directional selection include:

- Sudden environmental changes (biotic or abiotic) favouring one phenotype over a previously dominant phenotype;
- Colonization of a new habitat with novel selection pressures (as was the case with Darwin’s finches migrating to the Galápagos Islands two million years ago);
- The genetic context offers sufficient heritable variation and involves relatively minor interactions or correlations among genes (pleiotropy or epistasis) and trade-offs (antagonistic pleiotropy). Such interactions would not necessarily preclude directional selection, but would make it more complicated.

== Darwinian origins of the concept ==
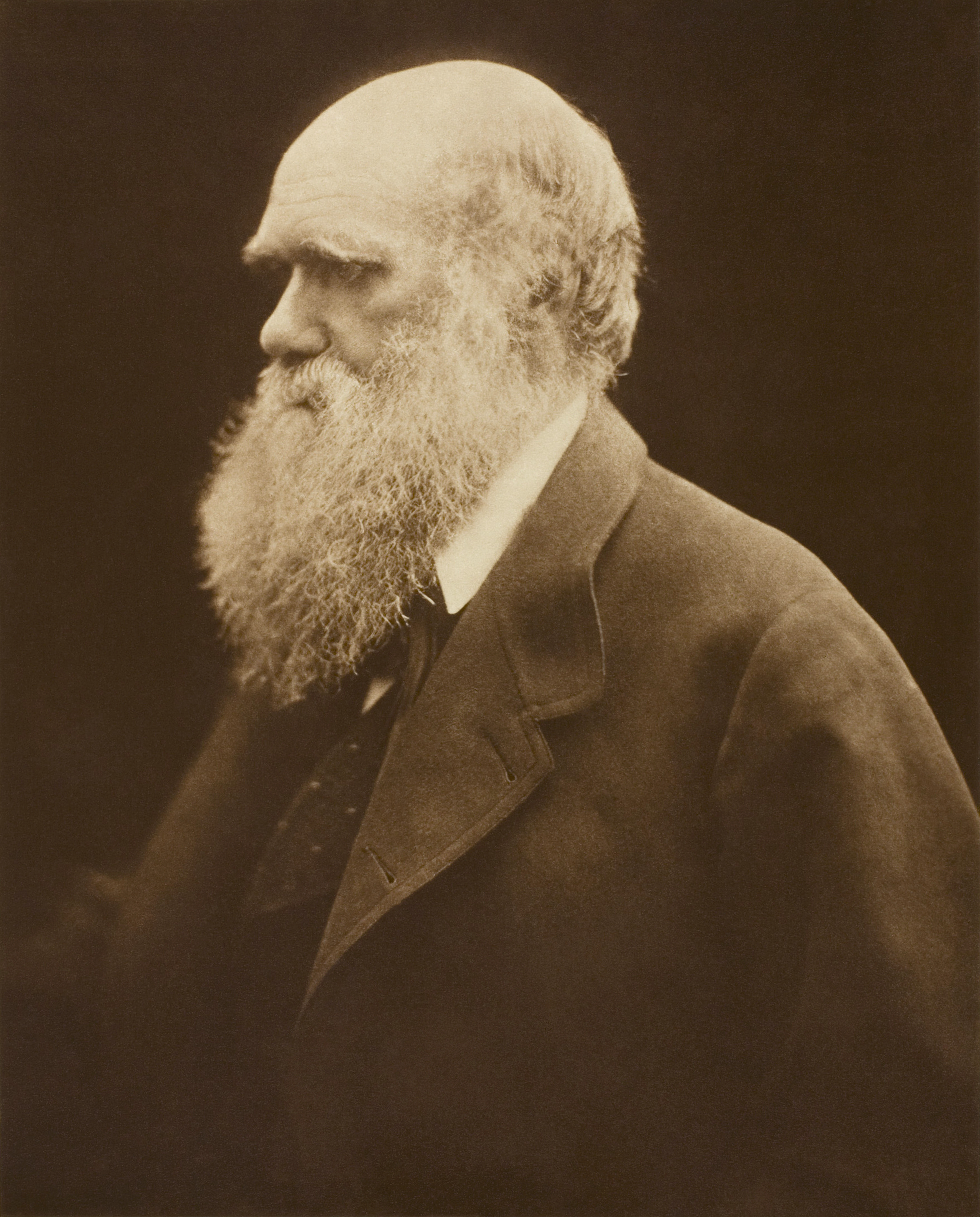
Darwin in 1862

Directional selection was first identified and described by naturalist Charles Darwin in his book On the Origin of Species published in 1859. He identified it as a type of natural selection along with stabilizing selection and disruptive selection. These types of selection also operate by favoring specific alleles and influencing the population's future phenotypic frequency distribution.

Stabilizing selection favors the intermediate phenotypes and selects against extreme phenotypes. It tends to reduce variance around the mean. Disruptive selection favors extreme phenotypes while, at the same time, selecting against the moderate phenotypes. The frequency of extreme alleles increases while the frequency of the moderate alleles decreases, possibly leading to a bimodal distribution.

== Genetic basis – types of selection and limits ==
At the genetic level, directional selection corresponds to the increase in frequency of one allele (or combination of alleles) that confers higher fitness, possibly ultimately causing it to reach fixation (that is, the relative frequency in the population is one or close to one). Directional selection can act on genetic mutations or on existing gene variation:

- Directional selection acting on new genetic mutations. A ‘hard selective sweep’ occurs when a beneficial mutation has occurred and increases in population frequency, thereby reducing genetic variation in the population. At the same time, genetic variation is reduced at loci that are closely linked to the favored gene, as related genes ‘hitchhike’ along with it as it comes to dominate the population.
- Directional selection acting on existing genetic variation. Another type of sweep, a "soft sweep from standing genetic variation," occurs when a previously neutral mutation that was present in a population becomes beneficial, often because of an environmental change. Such a mutation may be present on several genomic backgrounds so that when it rapidly increases in frequency, it does not erase all genetic variation in the population.

The limits of directional selection are apparent when, even under continued selection pressures, selection slows down or stops as available genetic variation is exhausted or genetic/correlated constraints are reached (so-called “selection limits”). A selection limit is a term from animal breeding and quantitative genetics that refers to a cessation of phenotypic change even when continued directional selection is being applied to a trait, such as body size. For example, an allele that is ‘good’ for the trait under directional selection may be ‘bad’ with respect to lifetime reproductive success. Under the body size scenario (which, for example, might enhance the ability of large predators to successfully hunt large prey), this might mean that an allele that confers larger body size might also reduce fertility, possibly eliminating the fitness benefits of the trait that directional selection was originally acting on.

== Examples ==
=== Peppered moths ===
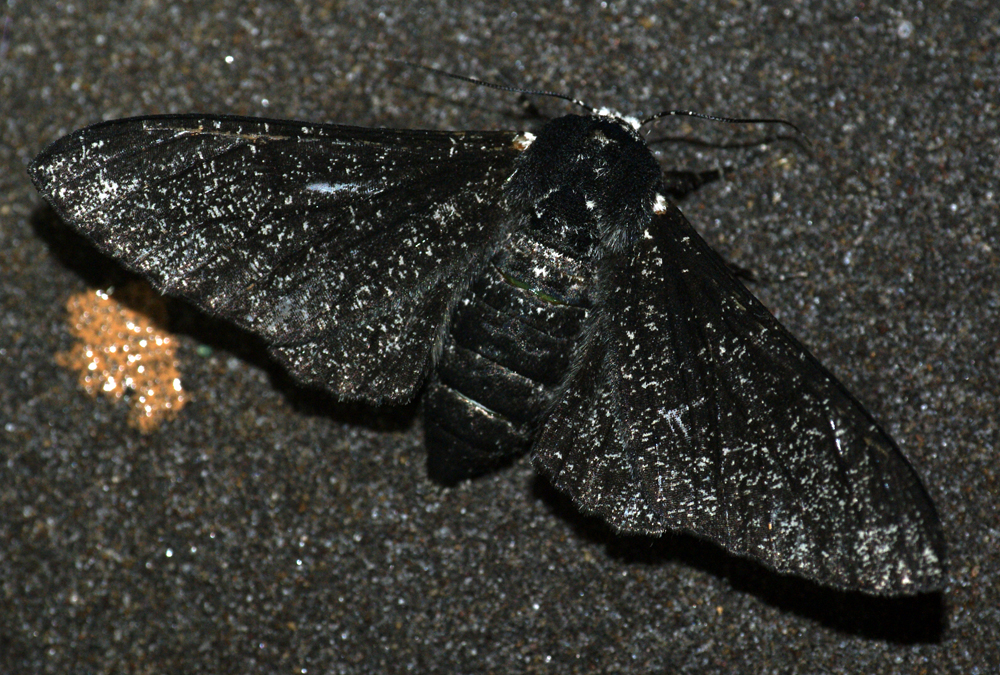
Peppered moth with dark phenotype that was positively selected for during the Industrial Revolution.

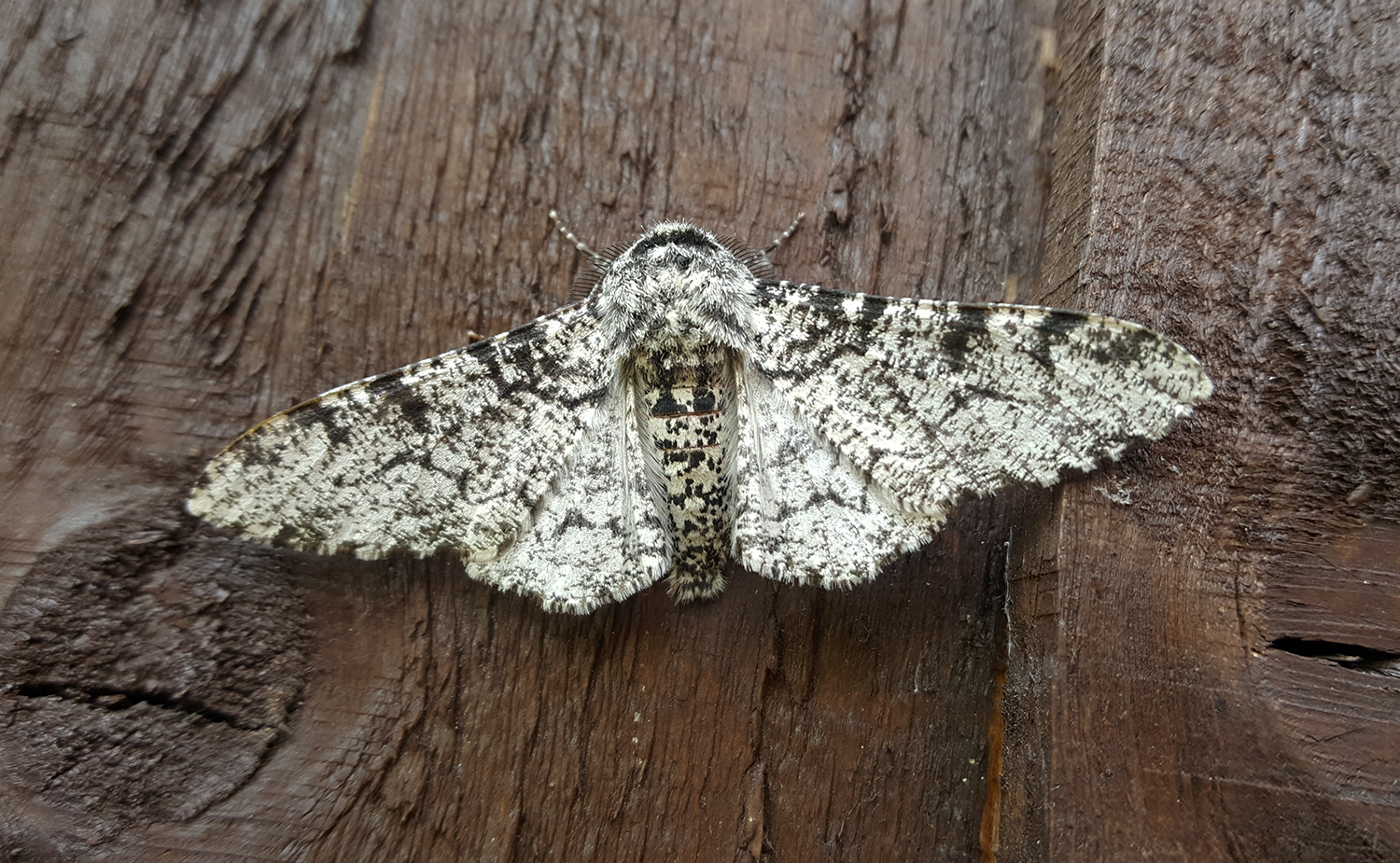
Peppered Moth with white phenotype that was negatively selected for during the Industrial Revolution.

A much-studied example of directional selection is the fluctuation of light and dark phenotypes in peppered moths in the 1800s. During the industrial revolution, environmental conditions were rapidly changing with the growing emissions of black smoke from coal-powered factories. The soot changed the color of trees, rocks, and other niches of moths. Before the industrial revolution, the most prominent phenotype in the peppered moth population was the lighter, speckled moths. They thrived on the light birch trees and their phenotype provided them with better camouflage from predators. After the Industrial Revolution as the trees become darker with soot, the moths with the darker phenotype were better able to blend in and avoid predators better than their white counterparts. As time went on, the darker moths were positively directionally selected for and the allele frequency began to shift due to the increase in the number of darker moths.

=== African cichlids ===
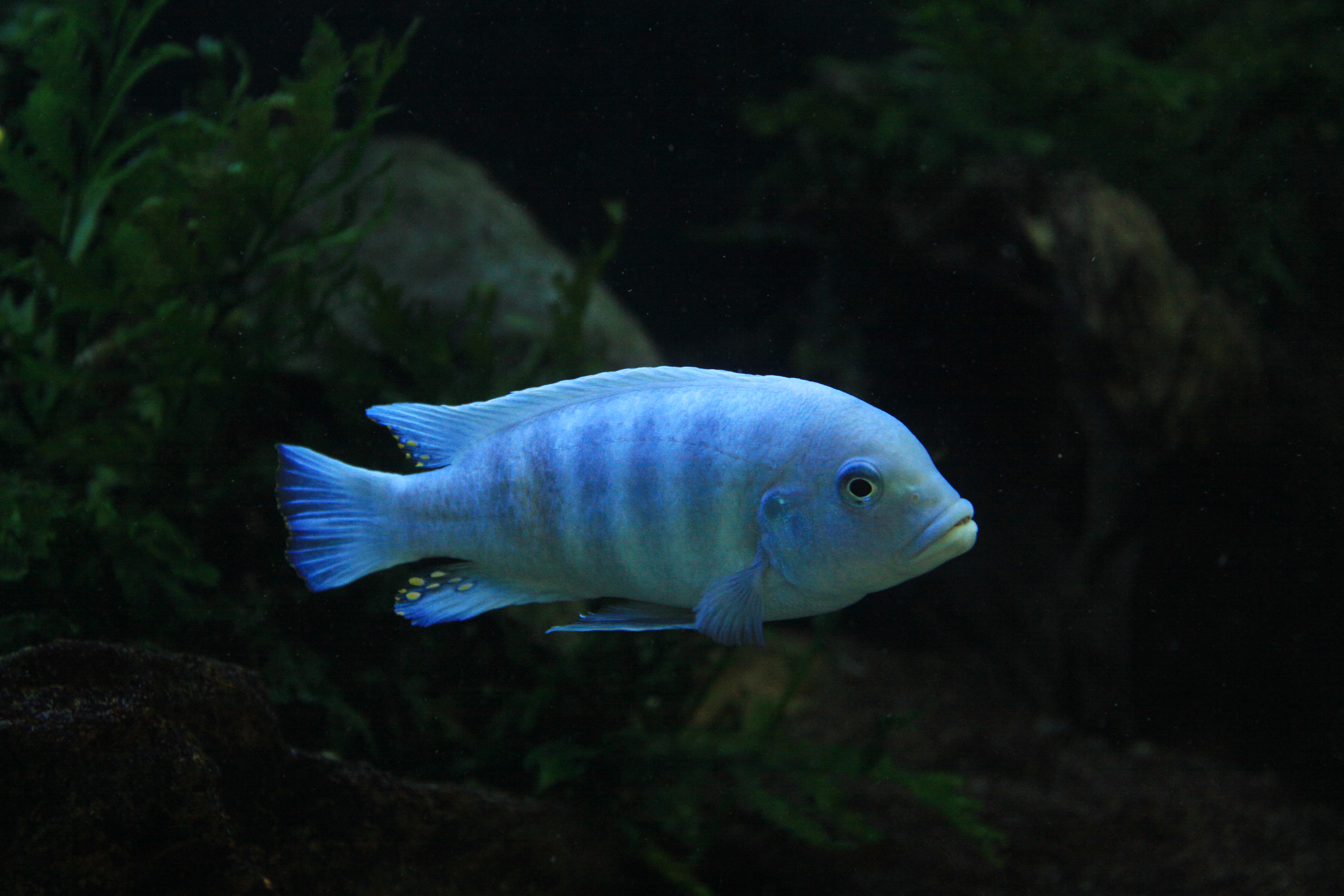
Labeotropheus fuelleborni

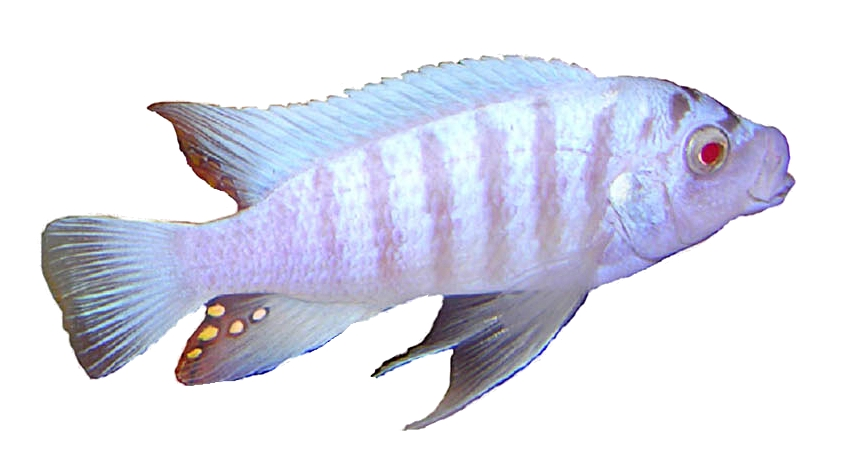
Metriaclima zebra

African cichlids are known to be a diverse fish species, with evidence indicating that they evolved extremely quickly. These fish evolved within the same habitat, but have a variety of morphologies, especially pertaining to the mouth and jaw. Experiments pertaining the cichlid jaw phenotypes were done by Albertson and others in 2003 by crossing two species of African cichlids with very different mouth morphologies. The cross between Labeotropheus fuelleborni (subterminal mouth for biting algae off rocks) and Metriaclima zebra (terminal mouth for suction feeding) allowed for mapping of QTLs affecting feeding morphology. Using the QTL sign test, definitive evidence was used to support the existence of directional selection in the oral jaw apparatus in African cichlids. However, this was not the case for the suspensorium or skull QTLs, suggesting genetic drift or stabilizing selection as mechanisms for the speciation.

=== Sockeye salmon ===
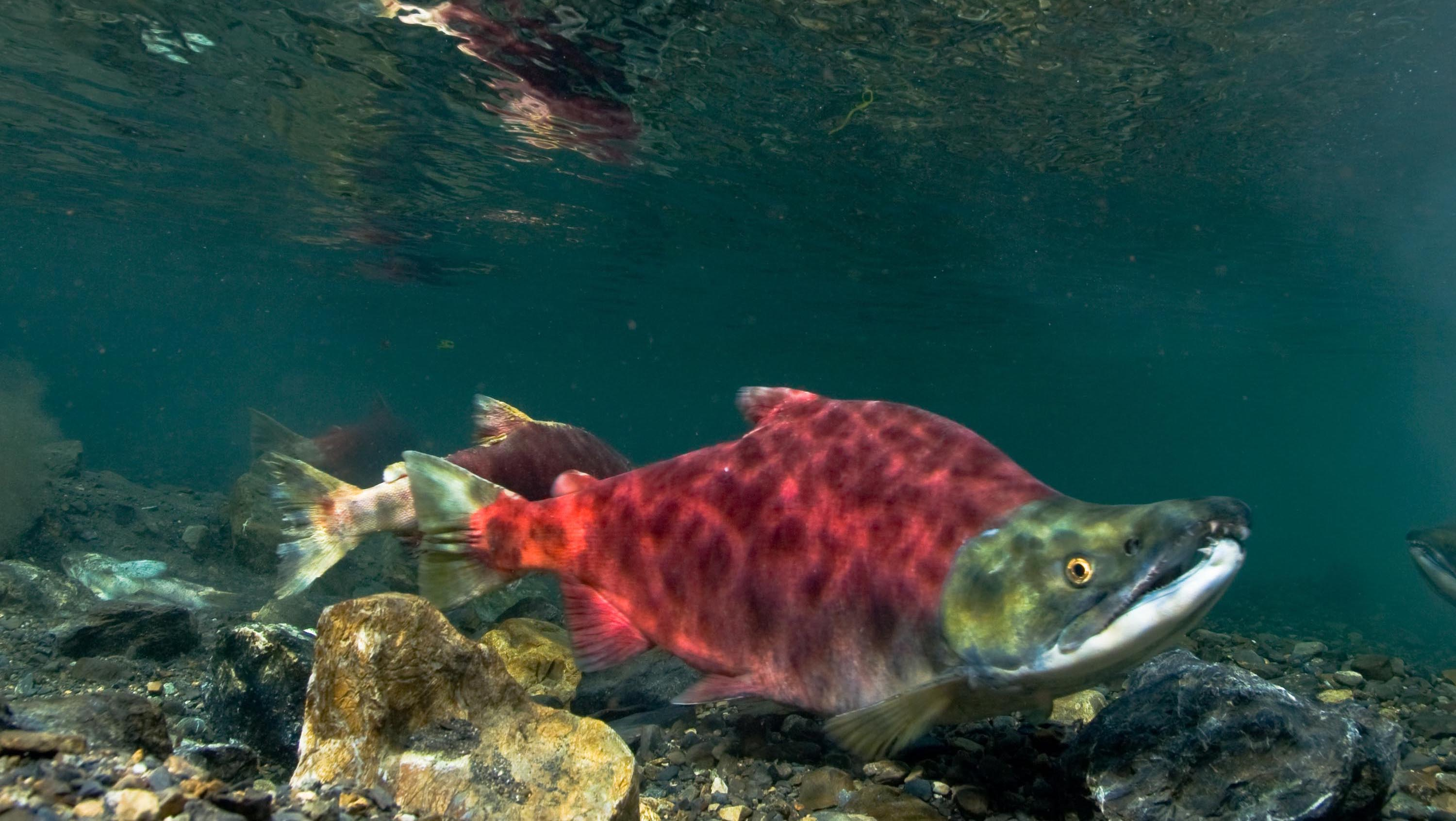
Sockeye Salmon

Sockeye salmon are one of the many species of fish that are anadromous –individuals migrate to the same rivers in which they were born to reproduce. These migrations happen around the same time every year, but a 2007 study shows that sockeye salmon found in the waters of the Bristol Bay in Alaska have recently undergone directional selection on the timing of migration. In this study, two populations of sockeye salmon, Egegik and Ugashik, were observed. Data from 1969–2003 provided by the Alaska Department of Fish and Game were divided into five sets of seven years and plotted for average arrival to the fishery. After analyzing the data, it was determined that in both populations the average migration date was earlier and the populations were undergoing directional selection as a result of changing ecological conditions. The Egegik population experienced stronger selection and the migration date shifted four days. The paper suggests that fisheries can be a factor driving this selection because fishing occurs more often in the later periods of migration (especially in the Egegik district), preventing those fish from reproducing.

=== Large Felids ===
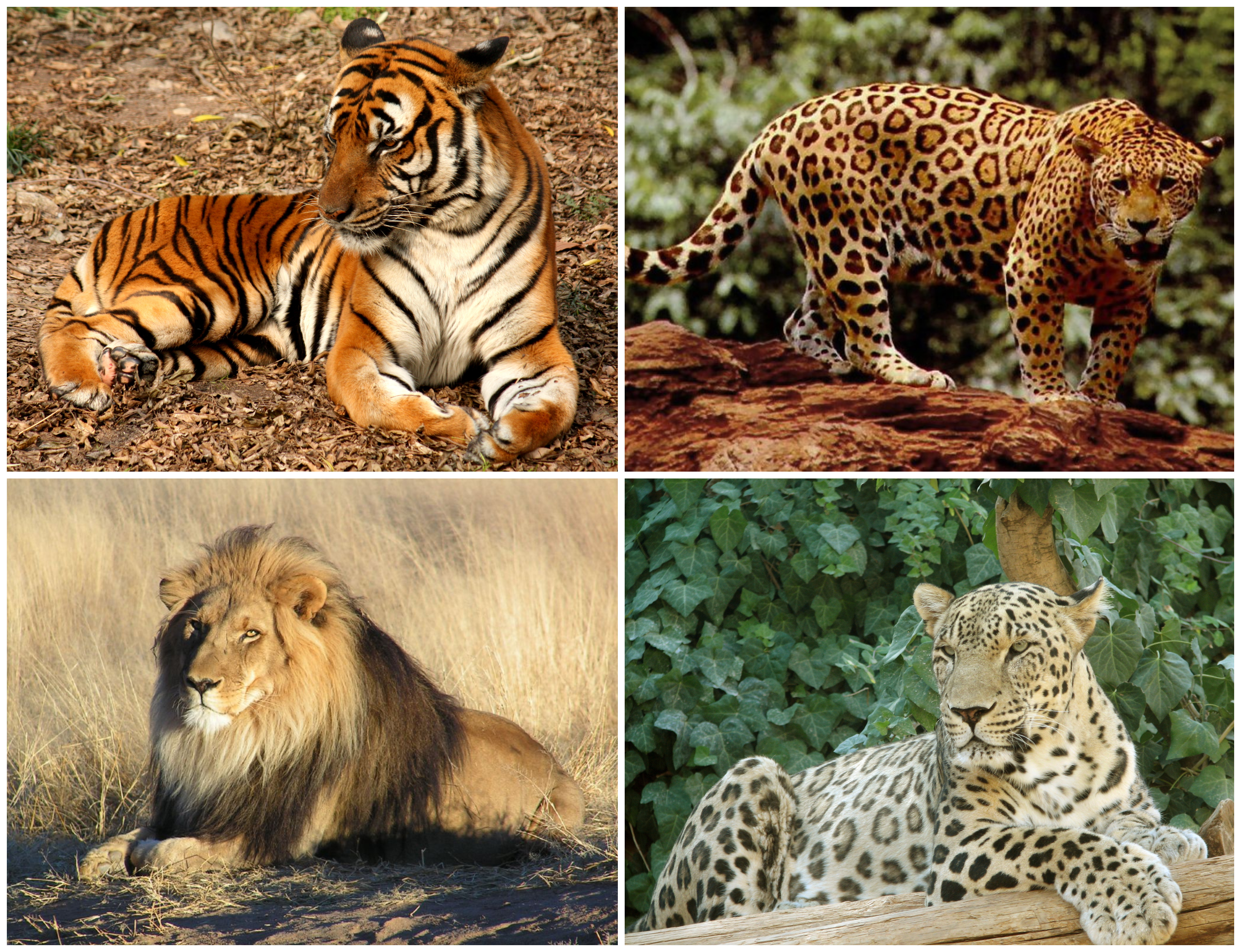
Clockwise from top-left: tiger, jaguar, leopard, lion

This study examines the role of lineage-specific directional selection on body size evolution in felids, revealing that several species, including those in the Panthera genus (lions, tigers, leopards, jaguars, snow leopards), the cheetah, and the puma, exhibit evidence of directional selection favoring larger body mass. These larger body sizes are likely linked to hunting large prey and solitary hunting strategies, which favor physical strength and size. Conversely, the clouded leopard did not show evidence of directional selection for body size, suggesting different ecological pressures, and the jaguarundi showed no clear selection for smaller size despite being smaller than its relatives. These findings highlight that body size evolution in felids is not uniform and is strongly influenced by ecological factors such as prey size and hunting behavior. The study concludes that directional selection for increased body size is likely associated with the need for larger predators to capture large prey, and solitary hunting may accelerate this selection, although the evolutionary paths for different felid lineages can vary considerably.

=== Soapberry Bugs ===
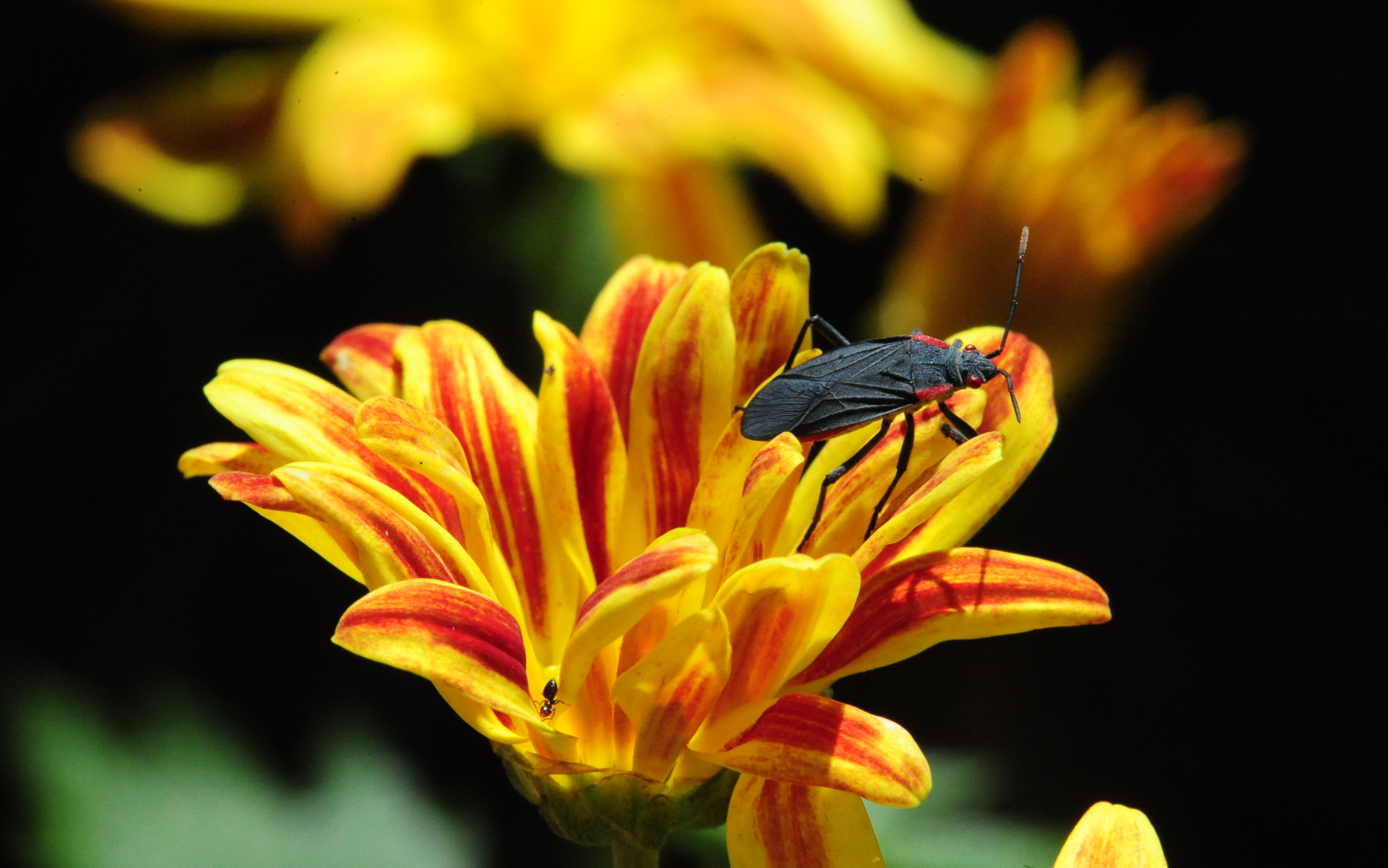
Jadera Haematoloma

Soapberry Bugs (Jadera haematoloma) primarily feed on seeds produced by plants of the Sapindaceae family. These soapberry bugs use their beaks to feed on the seeds within the fruits of these plants, so it is crucial that their beak size is long enough to reach the seeds from the exterior of the fruits. However, the distance from the exterior of the fruit to the seed can vary. Scott Carroll and Christin Boyd (1992) conducted an experiment where they would observe how three newly introduced plant species introduced to North America that were colonized by these soapberry bugs would affect the natural selection of the insect’s beak length. Each new plant species hosted fruits of different sizes compared to the native hosts. They found that there was indeed a close correlation between the radius of the fruit and the length of the beak. There was a positive directional selection for larger beaks when the radius of the fruit was larger, and there was a positive directional selection for smaller beaks when the radius of the fruit was smaller. To confirm that these differences were caused by genetic differences and not through phenotypic plasticity, Carroll raised young soapberry bugs from the populations based on the introduced plant species and found that their beak length was retained when they were developed on the alternative host.

== Detection methods ==
Directional selection most often occurs during environmental changes or population migrations to new areas with different environmental pressures. Directional selection allows for swift changes in allele frequency that can accompany rapidly changing environmental factors and plays a major role in speciation. Analysis on quantitative trait locus (QTL) effects has been used to examine the impact of directional selection in phenotypic diversification. QTL is a region of a gene that corresponds to a specific phenotypic trait, and the measuring the statistical frequencies of the traits can be helpful in analyzing phenotypic trends. In one study, the analysis showed that directional changes in QTLs affecting various traits were more common than expected by chance among diverse species. This was an indication that directional selection is a primary cause of the phenotypic diversification that can eventually result in speciation.

Different statistical tests can be run to test for directional selection in a population. A highly indicative test of changes in allele frequencies is the QTL sign test, and other tests include the Ka/Ks ratio test and the relative rate test. The QTL sign test compares the number of antagonistic QTL to a neutral model, and allows for testing of directional selection against genetic drift. The Ka/Ks ratio test compares the number of non-synonymous to synonymous substitutions, and a ratio that is greater than 1 indicates directional selection. The relative ratio test looks at the accumulation of advantageous traits against a neutral model, but needs a phylogenetic tree for comparison. This can prove difficult if the full phylogenic history is not known or is not specific enough for the test comparison.

== See also ==
- Adaptive evolution in the human genome
- Balancing selection
- Disruptive selection
- Frequency-dependent foraging by pollinators
- Negative selection (natural selection)
- Stabilizing selection
- Peppered moth evolution
- Fluctuating selection
