= Stabilizing selection =

Type of selection in evolution where a trait stabilizes around the average value

1: directional selection: a single extreme phenotype favoured. 2, stabilizing selection: intermediate favoured over extremes. 3: disruptive selection: extremes favoured over intermediate. X-axis: phenotypic trait Y-axis: number of organisms Group A: original population Group B: after selection

Stabilizing selection (not to be confused with negative or purifying selection) is a type of natural selection in which the population mean stabilizes on a particular non-extreme trait value. This is thought to be the most common mechanism of action for natural selection because most traits do not appear to change drastically over time. Stabilizing selection commonly uses negative selection (a.k.a. purifying selection) to select against extreme values of the character. Stabilizing selection is the opposite of disruptive selection. Instead of favoring individuals with extreme phenotypes, it favors the intermediate variants. Stabilizing selection tends to remove the more severe phenotypes, resulting in the reproductive success of the norm or average phenotypes. This means that most common phenotype in the population is selected for and continues to dominate in future generations.

Depending on the environmental conditions, a grey wolf may have an advantage over wolves with other variations of fur color. Wolves with fur colors that do not camouflage appropriately with the environmental conditions will be spotted more easily by the deer, resulting in them not being able to sneak up on the deer (leading to natural selection).

== History ==
The Ukrainian and later Soviet evolutionary biologist Ivan Schmalhausen founded the theory of stabilizing selection, publishing a paper in Russian titled "Stabilizing selection and its place among factors of evolution" in 1941 and a monograph "Factors of Evolution: The Theory of Stabilizing Selection" in 1945.

== Influence on population structure ==
Stabilizing selection causes the narrowing of the phenotypes seen in a population and deceases variation. This is because the extreme phenotypes are selected against, causing reduced survival in organisms with those traits. This results in a population consisting of fewer phenotypes, with most traits representing the mean value of the population. This narrowing of phenotypes causes a reduction in genetic diversity in a population. Maintaining genetic variation is essential for the survival of a population because it is what allows them to evolve over time. In order for a population to adapt to changing environmental conditions they must have enough genetic diversity to select for new traits as they become favorable. This form of selection also selects for canalisation, that is epistatic pathways that limit the effects of mutations on other genes that may change the phenotype under stabilising selection, preventing phenotypes different from the dominant wild type phenotype being selected for from manifesting even when mutations do occur in some of the genes involved in expressing them. This loss of penetrance of mutations that would otherwise produce phenotypic deviations from the wild type creates what Schmalhausen termed reserves of variability, the hidden genetic diversity within a population that can become apparent during times of severe environmental instability that disrupt normal ontogeny and produce phenotypes under a novel norm of reaction that would not have manifested for selection to act on during the previous environmental conditions. Reserves of variability can also manifest when one population is split into smaller, genetically isolated populations.

== Analyzing stabilizing selection ==
There are four primary types of data used to quantify stabilizing selection in a population. The first type of data is an estimation of fitness of different phenotypes within a single generation. Quantifying fitness in a single generation creates predictions for the expected fate of selection. The second type of data is changes in allelic frequencies or phenotypes across different generations. This allows quantification of change in prevalence of a certain phenotype, indicating the type of selection. The third type of data is differences in allelic frequencies across space. This compares selection occurring in different populations and environmental conditions. The fourth type of data is DNA sequences from the genes contributing to observes phenotypic differences. The combination of these four types of data allow population studies that can identify the type of selection occurring and quantify the extent of selection.

However, a meta-analysis of studies that measured selection in the wild failed to find an overall trend for stabilizing selection. The reason can be that methods for detecting stabilizing selection are complex. They can involve studying the changes that causes natural selection in the mean and variance of the trait, or measuring fitness for a range of different phenotypes under natural conditions and examining the relationship between these fitness measurements and the trait value, but analysis and interpretation of the results is not straightforward.

== Examples ==
The most common form of stabilizing selection is based on phenotypes of a population. In phenotype based stabilizing selection, the mean value of a phenotype is selected for, resulting a decrease in the phenotypic variation found in a population.

=== Humans ===
Stabilizing selection is the most common form of nonlinear selection (non-directional) in humans. There are few examples of genes with direct evidence of stabilizing selection in humans. However, most quantitative traits (height, birthweight, schizophrenia) are thought to be under stabilizing selection, due to their polygenicity and the distribution of the phenotypes throughout human populations.

- Birth Weight − A classic example of this is human birth weight. Babies of low weight lose heat more quickly and get ill from infectious diseases more easily, whereas babies of large body weight are more difficult to deliver through the pelvis. Infants of a more medium weight survive much more often. For the larger or smaller babies, the baby mortality rate is much higher. The bell curve of the human population peaks at a birth weight that the newly born babies exhibit the minimum death rate.

=== Plants ===
- Height − Another example of a trait, that might be acted on by stabilizing selection, is plant height. A plant that is too short may not be able to compete with other plants for sunlight. However, extremely tall plants may be more susceptible to wind damage. Combined, these two selection pressures select to maintain plants of medium height. The number of plants of medium height will increase while the numbers of short and tall plants will decrease.
- Cacti Spine Number − Desert populations of spiny cacti experience predation by peccaries, which consume the fleshy part of the cactus. This can be prevented by increasing the number of spines on the cactus. However, there is also a selection pressure in the opposite direction because there is a parasitic insect that will lay its eggs in spines if they are densely populated. This means that in order to manage both of these selection pressures the cacti experiences stabilizing selection to balance the appropriate number of spines to survive these different threats.

=== Insects ===
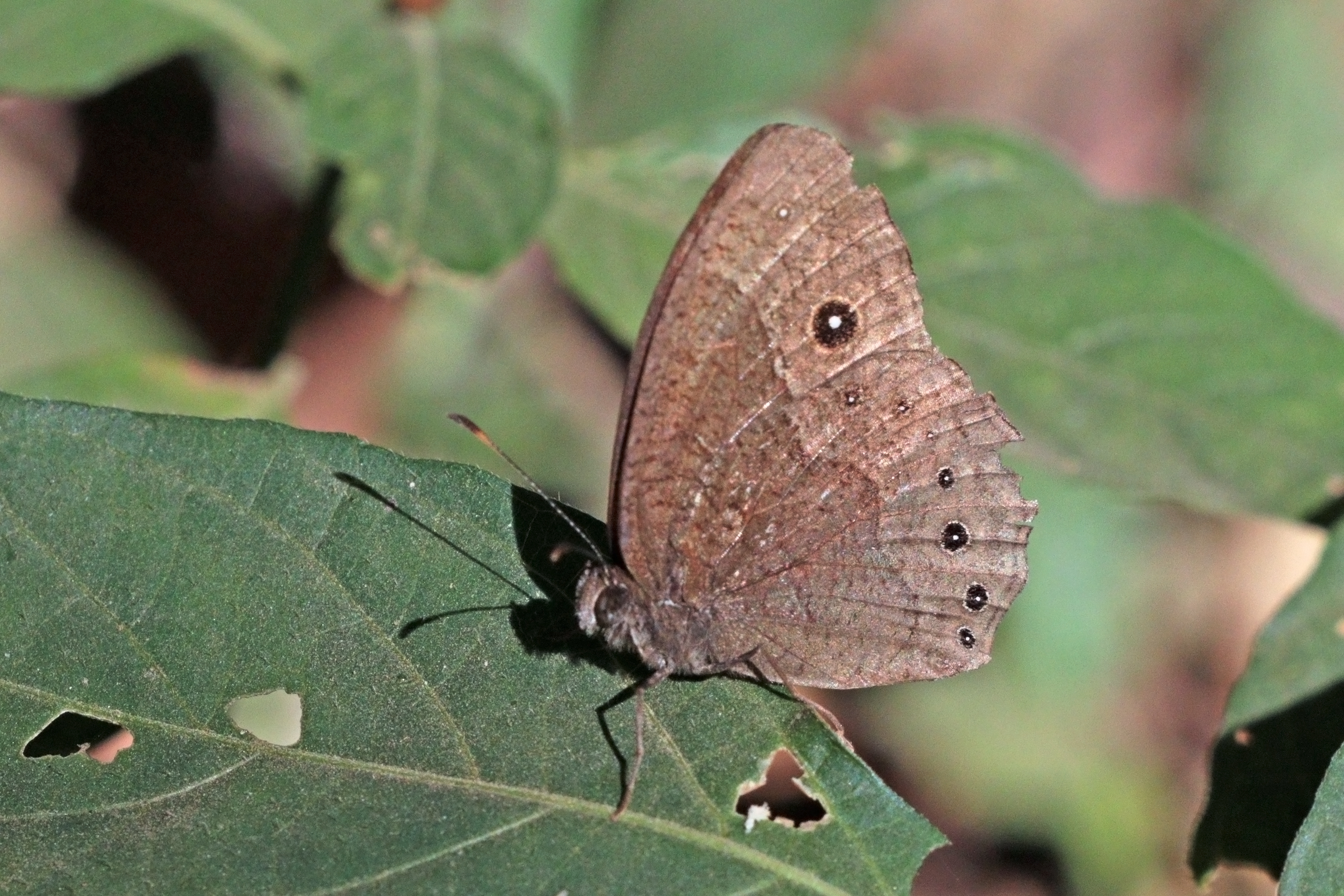
- Bicyclus anynana with wing eyespot, which experiences stabilizing selection to avoid predation.
  Butterfly's Winged Eyespots − The African butterfly Bicyclus anynana exhibits stabilizing selection with its wing eyespots. It has been suggested that the circular eyespots positioned on the wings are favoured functionally compared to other shapes and sizes.
- Gall Size − The Eurosta solidaginis fly lays its eggs on the tip of plants, which then encase the larvae in a protective gall. The size of this gall is under stabilizing selection, as determined by predation. These larvae are under threat from parasitic wasps, which lay a single egg in galls containing the flies. The single wasp offspring then consumes the fly larvae to survive. Therefore, a larger gall is favored to allow more places for larvae to hide from the wasp. However, larger galls attract a different type of predation from birds, as they can penetrate large galls with their beak. Therefore, the optimal gall is moderately sized in order to avoid predation from both birds and wasps.

=== Mammals ===
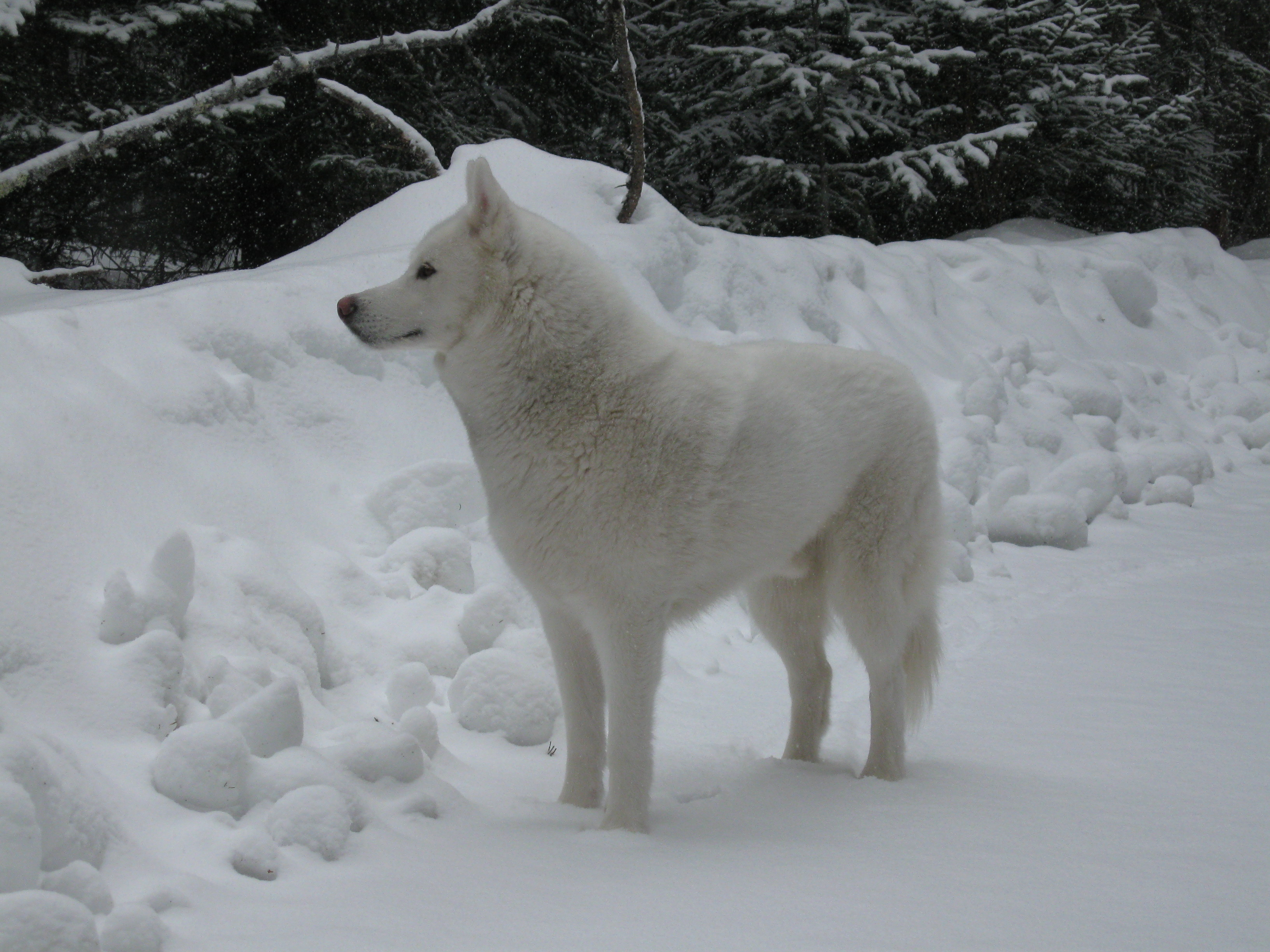
- The Siberian husky experiences stabilizing selection in terms of their leg muscles, allowing them to be strong but light.
  The Siberian husky experiences stabilizing selection in terms of their leg muscles. These dogs have to have enough muscle in order to pull sleds and move quickly. However, they also must be light enough to stay on top of the snow. This means that the leg muscles of the husky are most fit when they are moderately sized, to balance their strength and their weight.

== See also ==
- Ambidirectional dominance
- Assortative mating
- Balancing selection
- Directional selection
- Disruptive selection
- Frequency-dependent foraging by pollinators
- Fluctuating selection
- Hypergamy
- Koinophilia
