= Modern synthesis =

Modern synthesis or modern evolutionary synthesis refers to several perspectives on evolutionary biology, namely:

- Modern synthesis (20th century), the term coined by Julian Huxley in 1942 to denote the synthesis between Mendelian genetics and selection theory.
- Neo-Darwinism, the term coined by George John Romanes in 1895 to refer to a revision of Charles Darwin's theory first formulated in 1859.
