= Drosophila robusta =

Scientific classification
- Kingdom: Animalia
- Phylum: Arthropoda
- Class: Insecta
- Order: Diptera
- Family: Drosophilidae
- Genus: Drosophila
- Species: D. robusta

Binomial name
- Drosophila robusta Sturtevant, 1916

Species of fly

Drosophila robusta is a fly species in the genus Drosophila, first described by Alfred Sturtevant in 1916.
