= Population size =

Total number of individuals in a defined group or area

In population genetics and population ecology, population size (usually denoted N) is a countable quantity representing the number of individual organisms in a population. Population size is directly associated with amount of genetic drift, and is the underlying cause of effects like population bottlenecks and the founder effect. Genetic drift is the major source of decrease of genetic diversity within populations which drives fixation and can potentially lead to speciation events.

== Genetic drift ==
Of the five conditions required to maintain Hardy-Weinberg Equilibrium, infinite population size will always be violated; this means that some degree of genetic drift is always occurring. Smaller population size leads to increased genetic drift, it has been hypothesized that this gives these groups an evolutionary advantage for acquisition of genome complexity. An alternate hypothesis posits that while genetic drift plays a larger role in small populations developing complexity, selection is the mechanism by which large populations develop complexity.

=== Population bottlenecks and founder effect ===
Population bottlenecks occur when population size reduces for a short period of time, decreasing the genetic diversity in the population.

The founder effect occurs when few individuals from a larger population establish a new population and also decreases the genetic diversity, and was originally outlined by Ernst Mayr. The founder effect is a unique case of genetic drift, as the smaller founding population has decreased genetic diversity that will move alleles within the population more rapidly towards fixation.

=== Modeling genetic drift ===
Genetic drift is typically modeled in lab environments using bacterial populations or digital simulation. In digital organisms, a generated population undergoes evolution based on varying parameters, including differential fitness, variation, and heredity set for individual organisms.

Rozen et al. use separate bacterial strains on two different media, one with simple nutrient components and one with nutrients noted to help populations of bacteria evolve more heterogeneity. A digital simulation based on the bacterial experiment design was also used, with assorted assignations of fitness and effective population sizes comparable to those of the bacteria used based on both small and large population designations Within both simple and complex environments, smaller populations demonstrated greater population variation than larger populations, which showed no significant fitness diversity. Smaller populations had increased fitness and adapted more rapidly in the complex environment, while large populations adapted faster than small populations in the simple environment. These data demonstrate that the consequences of increased variation within small populations is dependent on the environment: more challenging or complex environments allow variance present within small populations to confer greater advantage. Analysis demonstrates that smaller populations have more significant levels of fitness from heterogeneity within the group regardless of the complexity of the environment; adaptive responses are increased in more complex environments. Adaptations in asexual populations are also not limited by mutations, as genetic variation within these populations can drive adaptation. Although small populations tend to face more challenges because of limited access to widespread beneficial mutation adaptation within these populations is less predictable and allows populations to be more plastic in their environmental responses. Fitness increase over time in small asexual populations is known to be strongly positively correlated with population size and mutation rate, and fixation probability of a beneficial mutation is inversely related to population size and mutation rate.

LaBar and Adami use digital haploid organisms to assess differing strategies for accumulating genomic complexity. This study demonstrated that both drift and selection are effective in small and large populations, respectively, but that this success is dependent on several factors. Data from the observation of insertion mutations in this digital system demonstrate that small populations evolve larger genome sizes from fixation of deleterious mutations and large populations evolve larger genome sizes from fixation of beneficial mutations. Small populations were noted to have an advantage in attaining full genomic complexity due to drift-driven phenotypic complexity. When deletion mutations were simulated, only the largest populations had any significant fitness advantage. These simulations demonstrate that smaller populations fix deleterious mutations by increased genetic drift. This advantage is likely limited by high rates of extinction. Larger populations evolve complexity through mutations that increase expression of particular genes; removal of deleterious alleles does not limit developing more complex genomes in the larger groups and a large number of insertion mutations that resulted in beneficial or non-functional elements within the genome were not required. When deletion mutations occur more frequently, the largest populations have an advantage that suggests larger populations generally have an evolutionary advantage for development of new traits.

== Critical Mutation Rate ==
Critical mutation rate, or error threshold, limits the number of mutations that can exist within a self-replicating molecule before genetic information is destroyed in later generations.

Contrary to the findings of previous studies, critical mutation rate has been noted to be dependent on population size in both haploid and diploid populations. When populations have fewer than 100 individuals, critical mutation rate can be exceeded, but will lead to loss of genetic material which results in further population decline and likelihood of extinction. This 'speed limit' is common within small, adapted asexual populations and is independent of mutation rate.

== Effective population size (N_{e}) ==
The effective population size (N_{e}) is defined as "the number of breeding individuals in an idealized population that would show the same amount of dispersion of allele frequencies under random genetic drift or the same amount of inbreeding as the population under consideration." N_{e} is usually less than N (the absolute population size) and this has important applications in conservation genetics.

Overpopulation may indicate any case in which the population of any species of animal may exceed the carrying capacity of its ecological niche.

== See also ==
- Carrying capacity
- Holocene extinction event
- Lists of organisms by population
- Overpopulation
- Population growth rate
