= Background selection =

Phenomenon inducing a loss of genetic diversity

Background selection describes the loss of genetic diversity at a locus due to negative selection against deleterious alleles with which it is in linkage disequilibrium. The name emphasizes the fact that the genetic background, or genomic environment, of a mutation has a significant impact on whether it will be preserved versus lost from a population. Background selection contradicts the assumption of the neutral theory of molecular evolution that the fixation or loss of a neutral allele can be described by one-locus models of genetic drift, independently from other loci. As well as reducing neutral nucleotide diversity, background selection reduces the fixation probability of beneficial mutations, and increases the fixation probability of deleterious mutations.

== Effect on neutral diversity ==
The degree to which neutral nucleotide diversity, which is quantified as the 'effective population size', is reduced due to background selection, depends on whether the neutral sites are linked to deleterious sites. For unlinked sites, it is reduced by exp(-8Ush), where U is the genome-wide deleterious mutation rate, s is the selection coefficient of deleterious mutations, and h is the dominance coefficient. This corresponds to the probability that an individual cannot appreciably contribute to the next generation because its genetic load is too high. The reduction is smaller for large s because deleterious mutations are removed more quickly from the population. For linked sites, diversity is reduced by exp(-u/r), where u/r is the ratio of deleterious mutation to recombination within a genomic window surrounding the neutral allele of interest. This corresponds to the probability that a gene copy is able to escape via recombination from nearby deleterious alleles. Background selection at linked sites dominates when U<1, while background selection at unlinked sites dominates when U>1.

Background selection contributes to a selective explanation of the positive correlation between local rates of recombination and polymorphism across the genome. In areas of high recombination, new mutations are more likely to 'escape' the effects of nearby selection and be retained in the population. The same correlation is also produced by genetic hitchhiking. The two theories are easiest to distinguish in regions of low recombination.

Failing to account for background selection can lead to errors in the inference of the demographic history of populations.

== Implications for asexual populations ==
Background selection in asexual populations produces Muller's ratchet, the accumulation of irreversible deleterious mutations. Background selection reduces the effective population size down to represent only those individuals with the fewest mutations, and sometimes this size stochastically falls to zero, producing one click of the ratchet.
