= Drift-barrier hypothesis =

The drift-barrier hypothesis is an evolutionary hypothesis formulated by Michael Lynch in 2010 as an application of mutation-selection balance to mutation rates. It suggests that the perfection of the performance of a trait, in a specific environment, by natural selection will hit a hypothetical barrier. The closer a trait comes to perfection, the smaller the fitness advantages become. Once this barrier is reached, the effects of further beneficial mutations are unlikely to be large enough to overcome the power of random genetic drift. Selection generally favors lower mutation rates due to the associated load of deleterious mutations that come with a high mutation rate.

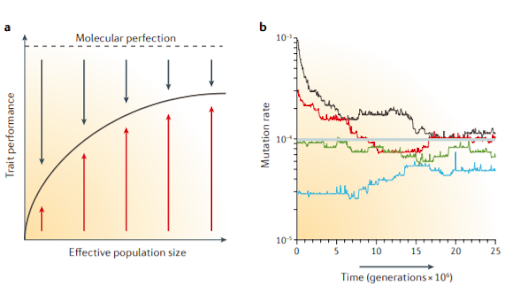
Left: Random genetic drift (blue arrows) impede selection (red arrows) towards 'genetic perfection'. Right: Simulation of mutation rates.

== Description ==
Every population contains a certain amount of genetic variation, coding for different functional traits. When the environment in which the population lives changes, some of these traits turn out to be more advantageous for this new situation than others. Through natural selection and random genetic drift, the traits with a negative effect on population fitness disappear from the gene pool. The balance between the influence of natural selection and genetic drift on the population mutation rate is mainly determined by the population size. Large populations are predicted to generally have lower mutation rates than smaller populations. Populations containing individuals with high mutation rates are more adaptable to environmental changes. Such populations have a bigger genetic pool, and therefore a bigger chance of containing an advantageous functional trait for this new environment. These advantageous functional traits get fixed in the population due to positive directional selection. The population keeps fixing these advantageous traits over time, pushing the population towards the genetic perfection associated with the environment. This increasing perfection causes mutations to have a higher chance of being deleterious. Individuals with a high mutation rate now increasingly decrease population fitness, and selection causes the mutation rate to decrease again. At the same time, new advantageous alleles have a diminishing positive effect on fitness. At a certain point, natural selection, mutation rate and random genetic drift reach a balance. This is called the drift-barrier.

== Exceptions for the drift-barrier hypothesis ==
Traverse and Ochman showed a striking exception to the drift-barrier hypothesis. In 2016, they measured transcriptional error rates in Escherichia coli as well as two endosymbiotic prokaryotes, Buchnera aphidicola and Carsonella ruddii. The endosymbionts had dramatically reduced genome sizes, increased mutation rates, and other features typical of their small population sizes. This included the loss of several transcriptional fidelity factors. Traverse and Ochman’s results showed that the transcriptional error rates between E. coli and the two endosymbionts were nearly equal, even though their population sizes were very different. Their initial prediction was that the endosymbionts would have higher transcription error rates as they were subject to a large amount of genetic drift. This would mean that they would therefore sustain more deleterious mutations. However, neither Buchnera aphidicola nor Carsonella ruddii had elevated transcription error rates.
