= Neutral site =

Neutral site may refer to:

- A neutral venue in sports
- Neutral site (genetics)
