= Jody Hey =

Jody Hey is an evolutionary biologist at Temple University. In the 1980s and 1990s he did research on natural selection and species divergence in fruit flies (Drosophila). More recently he has worked on the development of methods for studying evolutionary divergence, on the divergence of cichlid fishes from Lake Malawi, on chimpanzees and on human populations. His research on divergence and speciation also lead him to study the difficulties of identifying species.

Hey has also conducted mathematical and statistical research in population genetics. He is the author of several computer programs that are used by other biologists for questions in population genetics. In 2004 Hey and Rasmus Nielsen produced the computer program IM, which implements a method for fitting an isolation-with-migration model to a pair of closely related populations or species. They updated this method with a new program in 2007 called IMa.

For many years Hey was at Rutgers University. He moved to Temple University in 2013. He is currently the Director of the Center for Computational Genetics and Genomics at Temple.

In 1998 Hey received a Guggenheim fellowship.

In 2008 Hey was elected to the presidency of the Society for Molecular Biology and Evolution.

In 2018 Hey was elected as a AAAS Fellow.

== Hey on the species problem ==
Although a geneticist and evolutionary biologist, Hey has also published on philosophical and historical aspects of the species problem. He has argued that the difficulties of defining species cannot be addressed without also appreciating people's motivations and tendencies with regard to categorization. Hey has also questioned the development of, and debate over, multiple species concepts that were inspired by Ernst Mayr. More recently Hey examined the confusion between Mayr's idea of "Population thinking" and the biological concept of a population.

== Links to online articles ==
- Why Should We Care about Species? Scitable by Nature Education
- Journal Articles

== Books ==
- Genes Categories and Species Oxford 2001
- Systematics and the Origin of Species: On Ernst Mayr's 100th Anniversary National Academies Press 2005
