= Wen-Hsiung Li =

Taiwanese-American scientist

- 李文雄
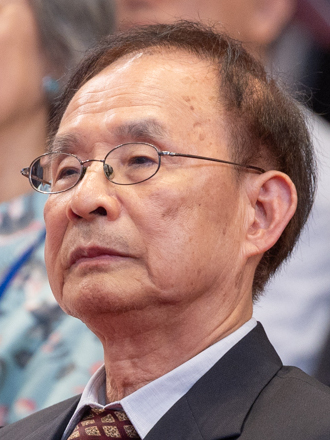
- Born: Wen Hsiung Li; September 22, 1942 (age 84); Pingtung, Taiwan
- Citizenship: Taiwan; United States
- Education: Chung Yuan Christian University (BS); National Central University (MS); Brown University (PhD)
- Known for: Male-Driven Evolution; Molecular clock Genomics
- Awards: Balzan Prize for Genetics and Evolution (2003); Mendel Medal (2009)
- Scientific career
- Fields: Applied mathematics
- Workplaces: University of Chicago; Academia Sinica; University of Texas; University of Wisconsin-Madison
- Thesis: Mathematical Studies On Mutational Damages In Finite Populations (1972)
- Doctoral advisor: Wendell Fleming
- Other academic advisors: Masatoshi Nei
- Website: Li Laboratory at University of Chicago; Wen Hsiung Li Profile at Academia Sinica

Wen-Hsiung Li (Chinese: 李文雄; pinyin: Lǐ Wénxióng; born September 22, 1942) is a Taiwanese-American scientist working in the fields of molecular evolution, population genetics, and genomics. He is currently the James Watson Professor of Ecology and Evolution at the University of Chicago and a Principal Investigator at the Institute of Information Science and Genomics Research Center, Academia Sinica, Taiwan.

== Biography ==
Li was born in Taiwan in 1942. In 1968, he received a M.S. in geophysics from National Central University. In 1972, he received his Ph.D. in applied mathematics at Brown University in Providence, Rhode Island. From 1972 to 1973, he was a post-doctoral researcher at the University of Wisconsin Madison (genetics), working with James F. Crow. In 1973, he moved to the University of Texas, where he was appointed as a professor in 1984. Since 1998, he has been a professor at the University of Chicago.

== Scientific contributions ==
Li is best known for his studies on the molecular clock (i.e. rates and patterns of DNA sequence evolution) and on the patterns and consequences of gene duplication.

In 2003, he received the international Balzan Prize for his contribution to genetics and evolutionary biology, and was elected to the National Academy of Sciences, who cited his role in "establishing theoretical foundations for molecular phylogenetics and evolutionary genomics". He is the author of the first textbook in the field of molecular evolution, Molecular Evolution and Fundamentals of Molecular Evolution (co-authored with Dan Graur), and an author on more than 200 peer-reviewed publications.

== Honors ==
- Academician, Academia Sinica Taiwan, 1998
- Member, American Academy of Arts and Sciences, 1999
- President of the “Society for Molecular Biology and Evolution”, 2000
- Member, National Academy of Sciences, 2003
- Balzan Prize 2003 for genetics and evolution (The third recipient, following Sewall Wright (1984) and John Maynard Smith (1991)).
- Inaugural Chen Award for Achievement in Human Genetic and Genomic Research, Human Genome Organisation, 2008
- 2019 SMBE Motoo Kimura Lifetime Contribution Award

== Selected publications ==
- Chu, T. -C.; Lu, C. -H.; Liu, T.; Lee, G. C.; Li, W. -H.; Shih, A. C. -C. (2013). "Assembler for de novo assembly of large genomes". Proceedings of the National Academy of Sciences. 110 (36): E3417–E3424. Bibcode:2013PNAS..110E3417C. doi:10.1073/pnas.1314090110. PMC 3767511. PMID 23966565.
- Gu, Z.; Steinmetz, L. M.; Gu, X.; Scharfe, C.; Davis, R. W.; Li, W. H. (2003). "Role of duplicate genes in genetic robustness against null mutations". Nature. 421 (6918): 63–6. Bibcode:2003Natur.421...63G. doi:10.1038/nature01198. PMID 12511954. S2CID 4348693.
- Makova, K. D.; Li, W. H. (2002). "Strong male-driven evolution of DNA sequences in humans and apes". Nature. 416 (6881): 624–6. Bibcode:2002Natur.416..624M. doi:10.1038/416624a. PMID 11948348. S2CID 4386652.
- Li, W. H.; Gu, Z.; Wang, H.; Nekrutenko, A. (2001). "Evolutionary analyses of the human genome". Nature. 409 (6822): 847–9. Bibcode:2001Natur.409..847G. doi:10.1038/35057039. PMID 11237007.
- Tan, Y.; Li, W. H. (1999). "Vision: Trichromatic vision in prosimians". Nature. 402 (6757): 36. Bibcode:1999Natur.402...36T. doi:10.1038/46947. PMID 10573416.
- Shyue, S.; Hewett-Emmett, D.; Sperling, H.; Hunt, D.; Bowmaker, J.; Mollon, J.; Li, W.H. (1995). "Adaptive evolution of color vision genes in higher primates". Science. 269 (5228): 1265–7. Bibcode:1995Sci...269.1265S. doi:10.1126/science.7652574. PMID 7652574. S2CID 25245772.
- Shimmin, L. C.; Chang, B. H. J.; Li, W. H. (1993). "Male-driven evolution of DNA sequences". Nature. 362 (6422): 745–7. Bibcode:1993Natur.362..745S. doi:10.1038/362745a0. PMID 8469284. S2CID 4345931.
- Graur, D.; Hide, W. A.; Li, W. H. (1991). "Is the guinea-pig a rodent?". Nature. 351 (6328): 649–52. Bibcode:1991Natur.351..649G. doi:10.1038/351649a0. PMID 2052090. S2CID 4344039.
- Graur, D. A. N.; Li, W.H. (1991). "Neutral mutation hypothesis test". Nature. 354 (6349): 114–6. Bibcode:1991Natur.354..114G. doi:10.1038/354114e0. PMID 1944591. S2CID 4267912.
- Wolfe, K. H.; Sharp, P. M.; Li, W. H. (1989). "Mutation rates differ among regions of the mammalian genome". Nature. 337 (6204): 283–5. Bibcode:1989Natur.337..283W. doi:10.1038/337283a0. PMID 2911369. S2CID 4336541.
- Gouy, M.; Li, W. H. (1989). "Phylogenetic analysis based on rRNA sequences supports the archaebacterial rather than the eocyte tree". Nature. 339 (6220): 145–7. Bibcode:1989Natur.339..145G. doi:10.1038/339145a0. PMID 2497353. S2CID 4315004.
- Sharp, P.; Shields, D.; Wolfe, K.; Li, W.H. (1989). "Chromosomal location and evolutionary rate variation in enterobacterial genes". Science. 246 (4931): 808–10. Bibcode:1989Sci...246..808S. doi:10.1126/science.2683084. PMID 2683084.
- Sharp, P. M.; Li, W.H. (1988). "Understanding the origins of AIDS viruses". Nature. 336 (6197): 315. Bibcode:1988Natur.336Q.315S. doi:10.1038/336315a0. PMID 3194016.
- Li, W. H.; Tanimura, M. (1987). "The molecular clock runs more slowly in man than in apes and monkeys". Nature. 326 (6108): 93–6. Bibcode:1987Natur.326...93L. doi:10.1038/326093a0. PMID 3102974. S2CID 4368098.
- Li, W. H.; Gojobori, T.; Nei, M. (1981). "Pseudogenes as a paradigm of neutral evolution". Nature. 292 (5820): 237–9. Bibcode:1981Natur.292..237L. doi:10.1038/292237a0. PMID 7254315. S2CID 23519275.
- Nei, M.; Li, W. H. (1979). "Mathematical model for studying genetic variation in terms of restriction endonucleases". Proceedings of the National Academy of Sciences. 76 (10): 5269–73. Bibcode:1979PNAS...76.5269N. doi:10.1073/pnas.76.10.5269. PMC 413122. PMID 291943.

== Selected books ==
- Li, W.-H. (2006). Molecular Evolution. Sinauer. ISBN 0-87893-480-4.
- Dan Graur; Wen-Hsiung Li (2000). Fundamentals of Molecular Evolution: Second Edition. Sinauer Associates, Inc. 1st edition. 1991.
