= Runs of homozygosity =

Runs of homozygosity (ROH) are contiguous lengths of homozygous genotypes that are present in an individual due to parents transmitting identical haplotypes to their offspring.

The potential of predicting or estimating individual autozygosity for a subpopulation is the proportion of the autosomal genome above a specified length, termed F_{roh}.

A research study in UK Biobank, All of Us and Million Veteran Program found that F_{ROH} declined over time in the US cohorts.

== Usage ==
This technique can be used to identify the genomic footprint of inbreeding in conservation programs, as organisms that have undergone recent inbreeding will exhibit long runs of homozygosity. For example, the step-wise reintroduction strategy of the Alpine Ibex in the Swiss Alps created several strong population bottlenecks that reduced the genetic diversity of the newly introduced individuals. The effect of inbreeding in the resulting sub-populations could be studied by measuring the runs of homozygosity in different individuals.

In clinical laboratory testing, the detection of ROH in itself does not indicate a particular genetic disorder but indicates an increased risk of autosomal recessive inherited diseases. As ROHs smaller than 3 Mb spread throughout the genome are common even in outbred populations, these segments were usually thought to not be important enough to report. Large ROH can be indicative of uniparental isodisomy with follow-up testing to rule out false positives, there is currently no consistent reporting standards among different laboratories.

ROH can be used to detect the possibility of incest in humans.
