= John H. Gillespie =

Evolutionary biologist

- Known for: Promoting natural selection (as opposed to neutralism) in molecular evolution
- Scientific career
- Fields: Evolutionary biology
- Workplaces: University of California, Davis

John H. Gillespie is an evolutionary biologist interested in theoretical population genetics and molecular evolution. In his research, he emphasized the importance of advantageous mutations and balancing selection. For that reason, Gillespie is well known for his selectionist stance in the neutralist-selectionist debate. He is widely considered the main proponent of natural selection in molecular evolution. He had a well-known feud with the father of the neutral theory of molecular evolution, Motoo Kimura, initiated by a 1984 review in Science of Kimura's book in which Gillespie criticized Kimura for "using the book as a vehicle to establish for himself a niche in the history of science." Gillespie had only four Ph.D. students during his career: Richard Hudson, James N. McNair, David J. Cutler, and Andrew Kern. However, he mentored many more. Gillespie was a professor in the College of Biological Sciences at the University of California, Davis until his retirement in 2005. He collaborated closely with Charles H. Langley and Michael Turelli throughout his career at Davis.
