= Fixation (population genetics) =

Change in a gene pool

In population genetics, fixation is the change in a gene pool from a situation where there exist at least two variants of a particular gene (allele) in a given population to a situation where only one of the alleles remains. That is, the allele becomes fixed. In the absence of mutation or heterozygote advantage, any allele must eventually either be lost completely from the population, or fixed, i.e. permanently established at 100% frequency in the population. Whether a gene will ultimately be lost or fixed is dependent on selection coefficients and chance fluctuations in allelic proportions. Fixation can refer to a gene in general or particular nucleotide position in the DNA chain (locus).

In the process of substitution, a previously non-existent allele arises by mutation and undergoes fixation by spreading through the population by random genetic drift or positive selection. Once the frequency of the allele is at 100%, i.e. being the only gene variant present in any member, it is said to be "fixed" in the population.

Similarly, genetic differences between taxa are said to have been fixed in each species.

== History ==
The earliest mention of gene fixation in published works was found in Motoo Kimura's 1962 paper "On Probability of Fixation of Mutant Genes in a Population". In the paper, Kimura uses mathematical techniques to determine the probability of fixation of mutant genes in a population. He showed that the probability of fixation depends on the initial frequency of the allele and the mean and variance of the gene frequency change per generation.

== Probability ==
=== Neutral alleles ===
Under conditions of genetic drift alone, every finite set of genes or alleles has a "coalescent point" at which all descendants converge to a single ancestor (i.e. they 'coalesce'). This fact can be used to derive the rate of gene fixation of a neutral allele (that is, one not under any form of selection) for a population of varying size (provided that it is finite and nonzero). Because the effect of natural selection is stipulated to be negligible, the probability at any given time that an allele will ultimately become fixed at its locus is simply its frequency $p$ in the population at that time. For example, if a population includes allele A with frequency equal to 20%, and allele a with frequency equal to 80%, there is an 80% chance that after an infinite number of generations a will be fixed at the locus (assuming genetic drift is the only operating evolutionary force).

For a diploid population of size N and neutral mutation rate $\mu$, the initial frequency of a novel mutation is simply 1/(2N), and the number of new mutations per generation is $2N\mu$. Since the fixation rate is the rate of novel neutral mutation multiplied by their probability of fixation, the overall fixation rate is $2N\mu \times \frac{1}{2N} = \mu$. Thus, the rate of fixation for a mutation not subject to selection is simply the rate of introduction of such mutations.

=== Non-neutral alleles ===
For fixed population sizes, the probability of fixation for a new allele with selective advantage s can be approximated using the theory of branching processes. A population with non-overlapping generations n = 0, 1, 2, 3, ... , and with $X_n$ genes (or "individuals") at time n forms a Markov chain under the following assumptions. The introduction of an individual possessing an allele with a selective advantage corresponds to $X_0 = 1$. The number of offspring of any one individual must follow a fixed distribution and is independently determined. In this framework the generating functions $p_n (x)$ for each $X_n$ satisfy the recursion relation $p_n (x) = p_1 ( p_{n-1}(x) )$ and can be used to compute the probabilities $\pi_n = P(X_n = 0)$ of no descendants at time n. It can be shown that $\pi_n = p_1 ( \pi_{n-1} )$, and furthermore, that the $\pi_n$ converge to a specific value $\pi$, which is the probability that the individual will have no descendants. The probability of fixation is then $1-\pi \approx 2 s / \sigma^2$ since the indefinite survival of the beneficial allele will permit its increase in frequency to a point where selective forces will ensure fixation.

Weakly deleterious mutations can fix in smaller populations through chance, and the probability of fixation will depend on rates of drift (~$1/N_e$) and selection (~$s$), where $N_e$ is the effective population size. The ratio $N_e s$ determines whether selection or drift dominates, and as long as this ratio is not too negative, there will be an appreciable chance that a mildly deleterious allele will fix. For example, in a diploid population of size $N_e$, a deleterious allele with selection coefficient $-s$ has a probability fixation equal to $(1-e^{-2 s}) /(1-e^{-4 N_e s})$. This estimate can be obtained directly from Kimura's 1962 work. Deleterious alleles with selection coefficients $-s$ satisfying $2 N_e s \ll 1$ are effectively neutral, and consequently have a probability of fixation approximately equal to $1/2N_e$.

==== Effect of growing/shrinking populations ====
Probability of fixation is also influenced by population size changes. For growing populations, selection coefficients are more effective. This means that beneficial alleles are more likely to become fixed, whereas deleterious alleles are more likely to be lost. In populations that are shrinking in size, selection coefficients are not as effective. Thus, there is a higher probability of beneficial alleles being lost and deleterious alleles being fixed. This is because if a beneficial mutation is rare, it can be lost purely due to chance of that individual not having offspring, no matter the selection coefficient. In growing populations, the average individual has a higher expected number of offspring, whereas in shrinking populations the average individual has a lower number of expected offspring. Thus, in growing populations it is more likely that the beneficial allele will be passed on to more individuals in the next generation. This continues until the allele flourishes in the population, and is eventually fixed. However, in a shrinking population it is more likely that the allele may not be passed on, simply because the parents produce no offspring. This would cause even a beneficial mutation to be lost.

== Time ==
Additionally, research has been done into the average time it takes for a neutral mutation to become fixed. Kimura and Ohta (1969) showed that a new mutation that eventually fixes will spend an average of 4N_{e} generations as a polymorphism in the population. Average time to fixation N_{e} is the effective population size, the number of individuals in an idealised population under genetic drift required to produce an equivalent amount of genetic diversity. Usually the population statistic used to define effective population size is heterozygosity, but others can be used.

Fixation rates can easily be modeled as well to see how long it takes for a gene to become fixed with varying population sizes and generations. For example, The Biology Project Genetic Drift Simulation allows to model genetic drift and see how quickly the gene for worm color goes to fixation in terms of generations for different population sizes.

Additionally, fixation rates can be modeled using coalescent trees. A coalescent tree traces the descent of alleles of a gene in a population. It aims to trace back to a single ancestral copy called the most recent common ancestor.

== Examples in research ==
In 1969, Schwartz at Indiana University was able to artificially induce gene fixation into maize, by subjecting samples to suboptimal conditions. Schwartz located a mutation in a gene called Adh1, which when homozygous causes maize to be unable to produce alcohol dehydrogenase. Schwartz then subjected seeds, with both normal alcohol dehydrogenase activity and no activity, to flooding conditions and observed whether the seeds were able to germinate or not. He found that when subjected to flooding, only seeds with alcohol dehydrogenase activity germinated. This ultimately caused gene fixation of the Adh1 wild type allele. The Adh1 mutation was lost in the experimented population.

In 2014, Lee, Langley, and Begun conducted another research study related to gene fixation. They focused on Drosophila melanogaster population data and the effects of genetic hitchhiking caused by selective sweeps. Genetic hitchhiking occurs when one allele is strongly selected for and driven to fixation. This causes the surrounding areas to also be driven to fixation, even though they are not being selected for. By looking at the Drosophila melanogaster population data, Lee et al. found a reduced amount of heterogeneity within 25 base pairs of focal substitutions. They accredit this to small-scale hitchhiking effects. They also found that neighboring fixations that changed amino acid polarities while maintaining the overall polarity of a protein were under stronger selection pressures. Additionally, they found that substitutions in slowly evolving genes were associated with stronger genetic hitchhiking effects.
