= Idealised population =

In population genetics an idealised population is one that can be described using a number of simplifying assumptions. Models of idealised populations are either used to make a general point, or they are fit to data on real populations for which the assumptions may not hold true. For example, coalescent theory is used to fit data to models of idealised populations. The most common idealized population in population genetics is described in the Wright-Fisher model after Sewall Wright and Ronald Fisher (1922, 1930) and (1931). Wright-Fisher populations have constant size, and their members can mate and reproduce with any other member. Another example is a Moran model, which has overlapping generations, rather than the non-overlapping generations of the Fisher-Wright model. The complexities of real populations can cause their behavior to match an idealised population with an effective population size that is very different from the census population size of the real population. For sexual diploids, idealized populations will have genotype frequencies related to the allele frequencies according to Hardy-Weinberg equilibrium.

== Hardy-Weinberg ==
In 1908, G. H. Hardy and Wilhelm Weinberg modeled an idealised population to demonstrate that in the absence of selection, migration, random genetic drift, allele frequencies stay constant over time, and that in the presence of random mating, genotype frequencies are related to allele frequencies according to a binomial square principle called the Hardy-Weinberg law.

== Usage in population dynamics ==
A good example of usage idealised population model, in tracking natural population conditions, could be found in a research of Joe Roman and Stephen R. Palumbi (2003). Using genetic diversity data, they questioned: have populations of North Atlantic great whales recovered enough for commercial whaling? To calculate genetic diversity the authors multiply long term effective population size of the females by two, assuming sex ratio 1:1, and then multiply by mitochondrial genes substitution rate, per generation. Making several assumptions according to the sex ratio and number of juveniles, they were able to calculate that in contrast to historical records, modern whale populations are far from harvestable range.

== Application to population history ==
Idealised population models could not only provide us with information about present populations conditions but are useful in revealing natural history and population dynamics in the past as well. Using an idealised population model, Anders Eriksson and Andrea Manica (2012) tested the hypothesis of the archaic human admixture with modern humans. The authors compare genome sequences of two human populations, Neanderthals and chimpanzee. Eriksson and Manica created a stepping stone model under which Africa and Eurasia are represented as a string of equal size populations. They concluded that under the stepping stone model, in which Europeans can exchange genetic information with Asians and not with Africans, similarities between Neanderthal genome and Eurasian could be explained by ancient populations structure.

== Computer simulations ==
Usage of models also allows the performance of simulations, including computerized ones, to hypothesize evolutionary outcomes:

- PopG is a free computer program that uses the Fisher–Wright model to simulate the simultaneous evolution of multiple populations and illustrate the results.
- The University of Connecticut hosts a Java-based genetic drift simulator designed to illustrate the influence of genetic drift on natural populations.
