= Selection coefficient =

Measure used in population genetics

Selection coefficient, usually denoted by the letter s, is a measure used in population genetics to quantify the relative fitness of a genotype compared to other genotypes. Selection coefficients are central to the quantitative description of evolution, since fitness differences determine the change in genotype frequencies attributable to selection.

The selection coefficient is typically calculated using fitness values. The fitness ($W$) of a genotype is a measure of its reproductive success, often expressed as a fraction of the maximum reproductive success in the population. The formula to calculate the selection coefficient $s$ for a genotype is: $s = 1 - W$, where $W$ is the relative fitness of the genotype, ranging between 0 and 1.

Suppose we have two genotypes, $AA$ and $Aa$, with relative fitness values of 1 (most fit, standard reference) and 0.8, the selection coefficient ($s$) for $AA$ is $1 - 1 = 0$ (no selection against this genotype); the selection coefficient ($s$) for $Aa$ is $1 - 0.8 = 0.2$ (this indicates that the $Aa$ genotype has 20% reduction in fitness compared to the $AA$ genotype).

For example, the lactose-tolerant allele spread from very low frequencies to high frequencies in less than 9000 years since farming with an estimated selection coefficient of 0.09-0.19 for a Scandinavian population. Though this selection coefficient might seem like a very small number, over evolutionary time, the favored alleles accumulate in the population and become more and more common, potentially reaching fixation.

== See also ==
- Evolutionary pressure
