= Star Beast =

Star Beast or starbeast, may refer to:

== Literature ==
- The Star Beast (novel), 1954 science fiction novel by Robert A. Heinlein
- Star Beast (novel), 1996 novel by Will Baker
- "The Star Beast", a 1949 short story by Damon Knight
- "The Star Beast", a 1950 short story by Poul Anderson
- "The Star Beast", a 2022 short story by Connie Wilkins, writing as Sacchi Green

== Doctor Who ==
- "The Star Beast" (Doctor Who episode), a 2023 episode of the 60th anniversary specials
  - The Star Beast, a 2024 novelization of the Doctor Who episode by Gary Russell
- "Doctor Who and the Star Beast" (comic), the original 1980 Doctor Who comic
- "Doctor Who and the Star Beast" (audio drama), the 2019 Big Finish audio drama adaptation of the comic

== Fictional characters ==
- Starbeasts (Japanese: 星獣, romanized: Seijū), a fictional race from tokusatsu TV series Seijuu Sentai Gingaman
- Star Beasts (Seishinjuu), a fictional type of creature from tokusatsu TV series Genseishin Justirisers
- Star Beasts, a fictional creature type from the anime TV series Beyblade: Metal Fury
- Starbeasts, a fictional creature type from the Hanna-Barbera animated cartoon TV series Space Stars

== Other uses ==
- "*BEAST" (starbeast), a Bayesian software package for phylogeny; see Multispecies coalescent process
- Star Beast, the working title of the film Alien

== See also ==
- "Wish Upon a Star Beast", a 1998 short story by Steve Lyons
- Huangfu Duan (alias "Beast Star"), a fictional character from Water Margin, one of the 108 Stars of Destiny
- Beast Star (Japanese: ビーストスター, romanized: Bīsuto Sutā), a fictional character from the tokusatsu TV series Uchu Sentai Kyuranger; see List of Uchu Sentai Kyuranger characters
- Beastars, a Japanese manga
- Beast (disambiguation)
- Star (disambiguation)
