= Apomorphy and synapomorphy =

Two concepts on heritable traits

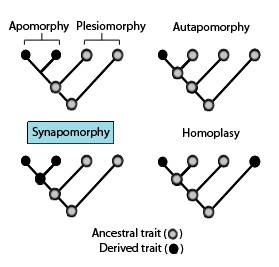
Phylogenies showing the terminology used to describe different patterns of ancestral and derived character or trait states.

In phylogenetics, an apomorphy (or derived trait) is a novel character or character state that has evolved from its ancestral form (or plesiomorphy). A synapomorphy is an apomorphy shared by two or more taxa and is therefore hypothesized to have evolved in their most recent common ancestor.

In cladistics, synapomorphy implies homology.

Examples of apomorphy are the presence of erect gait, fur, the evolution of three middle ear bones, and mammary glands in mammals but not in other vertebrate animals, such as amphibians or reptiles, which have retained their ancestral traits of a sprawling gait and lack of fur. Thus, these derived traits are also synapomorphies of mammals in general as they are not shared by other vertebrate animals.

== Etymology ==
The word synapomorphy—coined by German entomologist Willi Hennig—is derived from the Ancient Greek words σύν (sún), meaning "with, together"; ἀπό (apó), meaning "away from"; and μορφή (morphḗ), meaning "shape, form".

== Determining apomorphy ==
Whether a character state is derived or ancestral is called character polarity. Since genealogical classifications are based on synapomorphies, there must be a way to determine which character state is derived and which is ancestral (or what is special and what is general, to use less evolutionarily freighted terminology) without reference to genealogical classifications, to avoid a circular argument. Some features have been recognized as unique to particular taxa for thousands of years (e.g., feathers for birds, or an internal bony skeleton for vertebrates), and these sorts of common-sense presence/absence characters provide a scaffold upon which the polarity of other characters can be inferred: feathered animals form a natural group; things that lack feathers are just the complement - everything else (mammals, sharks, plants, bacteria). Once a taxon called "birds" is recognized that is defined by the synapomorphy "presence of feathers", then the polarity of other characters present at greater or lesser levels of inclusiveness can be discovered and evaluated. This may identify larger clades, such as the diapsid skull that defines diapsids, or less inclusive clades, such as the syrinx that defines songbirds.

== Examples ==
Lampreys and sharks share some features, like a nervous system, that are not synapomorphic because they are also shared by invertebrates. In contrast, the presence of jaws and paired appendages in both sharks and dogs, but not in lampreys or close invertebrate relatives, identifies these traits as synapomorphies. This supports the hypothesis that dogs and sharks are more closely related to each other than to lampreys.

== Clade analysis ==
The concept of synapomorphy depends on a given clade in the tree of life. Cladograms are diagrams that depict evolutionary relationships within groups of taxa. These illustrations are accurate predictive device in modern genetics. They are usually depicted in either tree or ladder form. Synapomorphies then create evidence for historical relationships and their associated hierarchical structure. Evolutionarily, a synapomorphy is the marker for the most recent common ancestor of the monophyletic group consisting of a set of taxa in a cladogram. What counts as a synapomorphy for one clade may well be a primitive character or plesiomorphy at a less inclusive or nested clade. For example, the presence of mammary glands is a synapomorphy for mammals in relation to tetrapods but is a symplesiomorphy for mammals in relation to one another—rodents and primates, for example. So the concept can be understood as well in terms of "a character newer than" (autapomorphy) and "a character older than" (plesiomorphy) the apomorphy: mammary glands are evolutionarily newer than vertebral column, so mammary glands are an autapomorphy if vertebral column is an apomorphy, but if mammary glands are the apomorphy being considered then vertebral column is a plesiomorphy.

== Relations to other terms ==
These phylogenetic terms are used to describe different patterns of ancestral and derived character or trait states as stated in the above diagram in association with apomorphies and synapomorphies.

- Symplesiomorphy – an ancestral trait shared by two or more taxa.
  - Plesiomorphy – a symplesiomorphy discussed in reference to a more derived state.
  - Pseudoplesiomorphy – a trait that cannot be identified as either a plesiomorphy or an apomorphy that is a reversal.
- Reversal – a loss of derived trait present in ancestor and the reestablishment of a plesiomorphic trait.
- Convergence – independent evolution of a similar trait in two or more taxa.
- Apomorphy – a derived trait. Apomorphy shared by two or more taxa and inherited from a common ancestor is synapomorphy. Apomorphy unique to a given taxon is autapomorphy.
  - Synapomorphy/homology – a derived trait that is found in some or all terminal groups of a clade, and inherited from a common ancestor, for which it was an autapomorphy (i.e., not present in its immediate ancestor).
  - Underlying synapomorphy – a synapomorphy that has been lost again in many members of the clade. If lost in all but one, it can be hard to distinguish from an autapomorphy.
  - Autapomorphy – a distinctive derived trait that is unique to a given taxon or group.
- Homoplasy in biological systematics is when a trait has been gained or lost independently in separate lineages during evolution. This convergent evolution leads to species independently sharing a trait that is different from the trait inferred to have been present in their common ancestor.
  - Parallel homoplasy – derived trait present in two groups or species without a common ancestor due to convergent evolution.
  - Reverse homoplasy – trait present in an ancestor but not in direct descendants that reappears in later descendants.
- Hemiplasy is the case where a character that appears homoplastic given the species tree actually has a single origin on the associated gene tree. Hemiplasy reflects gene tree-species tree discordance due to the multispecies coalescent.
