= Tajima =

Tajima is a Japanese name that may refer to:

== People ==
- Fumio Tajima (田嶋 文生, born 1951), Japanese population geneticist
- Gochin no Tajima (五智院 但馬), Japanese warrior monk
- Daiki Tajima (田嶋 大樹, born 1996), Japanese baseball player
- Hiroyuki Tajima (田嶋 宏行, 1911–1984), Japanese print maker of the Sosaku Hanga School
- Honami Tajima (田島 穂奈美, born 1988), Japanese actress
- Issei Tajima (田島 一成, born 1940), Japanese politician
- Kaname Tajima (田嶋 要, born 1961), Japanese politician
- Masaji Tajima (田島 政治, born 1929), Japanese long jumper
- Nabi Tajima (田島 ナビ, 1900–2018), Japanese supercentenarian
- Naoto Tajima (田島 直人, 1912–1990), Japanese athlete
- Nobuhiro Tajima (田嶋 伸博, born 1950), Japanese race car driver
- Princess Tajima (但馬皇女, died 708), daughter of Emperor Tenmu of Japan
- Renee Tajima-Peña (born 1958), American film director and producer
- Tsugio Tajima (田島 二男, 1903–2002), Japanese photographer
- Yasuko Tajima (田島 寧子, born 1981), Japanese swimmer
- Yoshifumi Tajima (田島 義文, 1918–2009), Japanese actor

== Characters ==
- Yūichirō Tajima (田島 悠一郎), a baseball player in the anime Big Windup!
- Haruki Tajima/Yukine (雪音) Yato's Reagalia in the anime Noragami

== Other meanings of Tajima ==
- Tajima, Fukushima, a town in Japan
- Tajima Airport
- Tajima cattle
- Tajima Group, a manufacturer of sewing and embroidery machinery
- Tajima Plateau Botanical Gardens
- Tajima Province, Japan
- Tajima's D, a statistical test
- Tajima-Mie Station

== See also ==
- Tajima Station (disambiguation)
