= BEAST 2 =

Bayesian evolutionary analysis by sampling trees
- Stable release: 2.7.8 / 2025-06-18
- Written in: Java
- Operating system: Windows, Mac OS X, Linux
- Type: Phylogenetics software
- License: GNU Lesser General Public License
- Website: http://www.beast2.org/
- Repository: https://github.com/CompEvol/beast2

BEAST 2 is a cross-platform program for Bayesian analysis of molecular sequences. Using MCMC, it estimates rooted, timed phylogenies using a range of substitution and clock models, and a variety of tree priors. There is an associated tool, called BEAUTi, for setting up standard analyses (which are specified using XML). BEAST 2 is a complete re-write of the earlier BEAST program (which is still actively developed and has recently been renamed BEASTX). A notable feature of BEAST 2 is the packaging system which has simplified the process of implementing novel models.

Taming the BEAST is a community driven resource which teaches the use of BEAST 2 and related phylogenetic software.

== BEAUti ==
BEAUti stands for "Bayesian Evolutionary Analysis Utility." It is a graphical user interface (GUI) that is used to create the input files for BEAST 2. It allows users to easily specify the various options and settings for their phylogenetic analysis, such as the data file, the model of molecular evolution, and the prior distributions of model parameters. BEAUti also allows users to specify the parameters for the MCMC analysis, such as the chain length and the sampling frequency. This makes it a user-friendly way to run BEAST 2, as it eliminates the need for users to manually edit XML input files.

BEAUti allows users to easily install and manage different packages, such as models of molecular evolution or coalescent models. These packages can be installed directly from within BEAUti. This makes it easier to add new functionality to the analysis without needing to manually download and install the packages.

== CBAN ==
The Comprehensive BEAST Archive Network (CBAN) is the official repository for BEAST 2 packages. Packages in CBAN can be installed via BEAUti out of the box.

== LinguaPhylo ==
A related project is LinguaPhylo (LPhy). LPhy is a probabilistic programming language for defining phylogenetic analyses with a syntax similar to OpenBUGS. It provides a way to generate BEAST 2 XML files (and similar model specifications for other phylogenetics packages) without needing to write the XML by hand.

== StarBEAST ==
StarBEAST (originally *BEAST) is a set of packages for inferring species trees under the multispecies coalescent model, which accounts for incomplete lineage sorting by modelling gene trees as evolving within the branches of a shared species tree. The original method, described by Joseph Heled and Alexei Drummond in 2010, jointly estimates the species tree, divergence times, ancestral effective population sizes and the gene trees. It was extended as a new BEAST 2 package in StarBEAST2 (2017), which added multispecies-coalescent-aware relaxed clock models for per-species substitution rates, and extended in StarBeast3 (2022), which introduced adaptive parallelised inference for data sets of several hundred loci. Reviews of multispecies-coalescent inference describe *BEAST and BPP as "the two Bayesian programs implementing the model in common use".

== MASTER/remaster ==
A particularly important package in the BEAST 2 ecosystems is remaster (formerly MASTER). Remaster is a tool for simulating population trajectories and phylogenies from birth-death and coalescent models. It is used in simulation studies to validate novel methodologies.
