= Fumio Tajima =

Japanese population geneticist (born 1951)

Fumio Tajima (田嶋 文生, Tajima Fumio), (born 1951) is a Japanese population geneticist known for his contributions to coalescence theory. He developed the test statistic now known as Tajima's D.

== Biography ==
Fumio Tajima was born in Ōkawa, in Japan's Fukuoka prefecture, in 1951. He graduated from high school in 1970, completed his undergraduate degree at Kyushu University in 1976, and received a Master's degree from the same institution in 1978. Tajima later stated that during his undergraduate degree he studied under Tsutomu Haga, and that he chose to study genetics after a meeting with him. In 1979 Tajima became a graduate student at the University of Texas in Houston, where he was supervised by Masatoshi Nei. He submitted his doctoral dissertation in 1983. Tajima returned to Kyushu university as a visiting scholar in 1983. Beginning in 1989, he worked at the National Institute of Genetics as an assistant professor and then an associate professor, before moving to the University of Tokyo in 1995. There, he became a professor in the Division of Biodiversity and Evolution, a unit of the Department of Biological Sciences. In 2008, he won the Kihara prize awarded by the Genetics Society of Japan. He retired in 2017.

As a graduate student, Tajima was one of several researchers working independently on coalescence theory, which seeks to describe the evolutionary history of a single locus. His training in phylogenetics and population genetics put him in a good position to explore evolutionary trees with respect to single loci. In a 1983 paper, published in the journal Genetics, Tajima laid out findings that have since been described as among the "most important results in coalescence theory". These included the mean and the variance of the time between the present and the most recent common ancestor. In his paper, Tajima showed that well-known results of "classical" population genetics could be reproduced by using coalescence theory. While doing so, Tajima was likely unaware of the previous work of John Kingman in the same area. The 1983 paper has been described as among the "founding papers of modern population genetics".

In 1989 Tajima published another influential paper in Genetics. This paper described a method to use the site frequency spectrum to estimate whether a population is evolving neutrally, evolving under directional selection, or evolving under balancing selection. This test statistic, which is known as Tajima's D, became a widely used test for neutrality among population geneticists.
