= Polygenic adaptation =

Polygenic adaptation describes a process in which a population adapts through small changes in allele frequencies at hundreds or thousands of loci.

Many traits in humans and other species are highly polygenic, i.e., affected by standing genetic variation at hundreds or thousands of loci. Under normal conditions, the genetic variation underlying such traits is governed by stabilizing selection, in which natural selection acts to hold the population close to an optimal phenotype. However, if the phenotypic optimum changes, then the population can adapt by small directional shifts in allele frequencies spread across all the variants that affect the trait. Polygenic adaptation can occur relatively quickly (as described in the breeder's equation), however it is difficult to detect from genomic data because the changes in allele frequencies at individual loci are very small.

Polygenic adaptation represents an alternative to adaptation by selective sweeps. In classic selective sweep models, a single new mutation sweeps through a population to fixation, purging variation from a region of linkage around the selected site. More recent models have focused on partial sweeps, and on soft sweeps - i.e., sweeps that start from standing variation or comprise multiple sweeping variants at the same locus. All of these models focus on adaptation through genetic changes at a single locus and they generally assume large changes in allele frequencies.

The concept of polygenic adaptation is related to classical models from quantitative genetics. However, traditional models in quantitative genetics usually abstract away the contributions of individual loci by focusing instead on means and variances of genetic scores. In contrast, population genetics models and data analysis have generally emphasized models of adaptation through sweeps at individual loci. The modern formulation of polygenic adaptation in population genetics was developed in a pair of 2010 review articles.

== Examples of polygenic adaptation ==
Polygenic adaptation is presumed to be the dominant mode of adaptation in artificial selection, when plants or animals undergo rapid responses to selective pressures. However, in most cases the actual genetic loci involved are not yet known (but see e.g.,).

At present the best-understood examples of polygenic adaptation are in humans, and particularly for height, a trait that can be interpreted using data from genome-wide association studies. In a 2012 paper, Joel Hirschhorn and colleagues showed that there was a consistent tendency for the "tall" alleles at genome-wide significant loci to be at higher frequencies in northern Europeans than in southern Europeans. They interpreted this observation to indicate that the difference in average height between northern and southern Europeans is at least partly genetic (as opposed to environmental) and that it was driven by selection. This result has been replicated by subsequent studies, however the environmental factor driving the selection remains unclear. A study of recent polygenic adaptation in the English has shown that selection on height has had small effects on allele frequencies (<1%) across most of the genome, and found evidence for polygenic adaptation in a wide variety of other traits as well including selection for increased infant birth size and increased female hip and waist size.
