= Tashima =

Tashima (written: 田嶋 or 田島 lit. "field island") is a Japanese surname. Notable people with the surname include:

- A. Wallace Tashima (born 1934), American judge
- Chris Tashima (born 1960), American actor and film director
- Kozo Tashima (田嶋 幸三, born 1957), Japanese footballer
- Meru Tashima (田島 芽瑠, born 2000), Japanese singer and idol
- Rintaro Tashima (田嶋 凜太郎, born 1997), Japanese footballer

== See also ==
- Tajima (disambiguation)
