= Joseph Heled =

Israeli–New Zealand bioinformatician (1961–2025)

Joseph Heled (23 February 1961 – 18 March 2025) was an Israeli–New Zealand bioinformatician and computational biologist known for his work on Bayesian phylogenetics. He introduced, with Alexei Drummond, the first fully Bayesian method for jointly estimating species trees, gene trees and ancestral population sizes under the multispecies coalescent, implemented as *BEAST, and was a core developer of the BEAST 2 software platform.

== Early life and education ==
Heled was born in Jerusalem, raised in Kibbutz Hukok in northern Israel and educated at Beit Yerach High School. He later settled in New Zealand, where he completed a PhD in the Computational Evolution Group at the University of Auckland under the supervision of Alexei Drummond. In 2011 his dissertation received the University of Auckland Vice-Chancellor's Prize for Best Doctoral Thesis.

== Research ==
=== Species tree inference ===
Heled's best-known contribution is the *BEAST method, published with Drummond in Molecular Biology and Evolution in 2010. Earlier approaches inferred a species tree by first estimating gene trees for each locus and then reconciling them. *BEAST instead co-estimates the species tree, the gene trees and ancestral population sizes in a single Bayesian analysis under the multispecies coalescent, propagating the uncertainty in each through to the others. The method became one of the standard full-likelihood implementations of the multispecies coalescent and is surveyed as such in reviews of species tree inference. A 2021 review of the multispecies coalescent identified *BEAST and BPP as the two Bayesian programs implementing the model in common use. Heled also co-authored a 2016 study assessing the method's computational performance and statistical accuracy against competing approaches.

Related work extended the multispecies coalescent to gene tree simulation under time-dependent migration and derived analytical results for sequence diversity under a Yule process with constant population size.

=== Demographic inference and tree priors ===
With Drummond, Heled developed the extended Bayesian skyline plot, which infers population size history from multiple unlinked loci rather than a single gene. He also worked on the statistical treatment of fossil calibrations in molecular clock analyses, showing how calibration densities interact with the tree prior and proposing constructions that yield the intended marginal prior on calibrated divergence times.

=== Software ===
Heled was a core developer of BEAST 2, an open-source platform for Bayesian evolutionary analysis, and is second author on the paper describing it. He remained a contributor to the successor release, BEAST 2.5. With Remco Bouckaert he worked on methods for summarising and visualising sets of phylogenetic trees, including the problem of choosing a single summary tree from a posterior sample and the DensiTree 2 visualisation tool.

He also contributed to applied studies using these methods, including a multigene environmental DNA approach to biodiversity assessment in New Zealand.

== Other work ==
Heled was a long-standing contributor to GNU Backgammon, where he worked on the neural network position evaluators that underpin the program's playing strength, including supervised learning from rollout data, separate networks for race, contact and crashed positions, and pruning networks for candidate move generation. He published a Hebrew translation of Richard K. Morgan's novel Altered Carbon in 2018.

== Selected publications ==
- Heled, Joseph; Drummond, Alexei J. (2008). "Bayesian Inference of Population Size History from Multiple Loci". BMC Evolutionary Biology. 8 (1): 289. Bibcode:2008BMCEE...8..289H. doi:10.1186/1471-2148-8-289. PMC 2636790. PMID 18947398.
- Heled, Joseph; Drummond, Alexei J. (2010). "Bayesian Inference of Species Trees from Multilocus Data". Molecular Biology and Evolution. 27 (3): 570–580. doi:10.1093/molbev/msp274. PMC 2822290. PMID 19906793.
- Heled, Joseph; Drummond, Alexei J. (2012). "Calibrated Tree Priors for Relaxed Phylogenetics and Divergence Time Estimation". Systematic Biology. 61 (1): 138–149. doi:10.1093/sysbio/syr087. PMC 3243734. PMID 21856631.
- Bouckaert, Remco; Heled, Joseph; et al. (2014). "BEAST 2: A Software Platform for Bayesian Evolutionary Analysis". PLOS Computational Biology. 10 (4) e1003537. Bibcode:2014PLSCB..10E3537B. doi:10.1371/journal.pcbi.1003537. PMC 3985171. PMID 24722319.
