= Tajima Station =

Tajima Station is the name of two train stations in Japan:

- Tajima Station (Nara) (但馬駅), a railway station in Miyake, Shiki District, Nara Prefecture, Japan
- Tajima Station (Tochigi) (田島駅), a train station in Sano, Tochigi Prefecture, Japan

== See also ==
- Tajima (disambiguation)
