= Margaret Wu =

Australian statistician and psychometrician

- Education: University of Melbourne; Royal Melbourne Institute of Technology
- Scientific career
- Workplaces: Monash University
- Thesis: The application of item response theory to measure problem-solving proficiencies (2004)

Margaret Wu is an Australian statistician and psychometrician who specialises in educational measurement. She is an honorary professor at the University of Melbourne.

== Early life ==
Wu studied statistics at the University of Melbourne and graduated in 1972. She worked at Monash University as a research assistant from 1973 to 1975, where she taught herself to program. She worked with Watterson on the Watterson estimator, a means to determine the genetic diversity of a population.

== Research and career ==
Wu joined CSIRO as a technical officer in 1977. She earned a graduate diploma in computer studies from the Royal Melbourne Institute of Technology in 1985. Wu became a high school teacher at Ivanhoe Girls' Grammar School, teaching Chinese and mathematics. She was appointed as a senior research fellow in the Australian Council of Educational Research Development (ACER) in 1992, where she was deputy director of Programme for International Student Assessment (PISA). Working with ACER and the University of Melbourne, Wu completed her master's, which was awarded the Freda Cohen Award for the Best Masters Thesis in Education. Wu remained at the University of Melbourne for her PhD, modelling student assessment data with underlying abilities modelled as latent variables.

She was appointed associate professor at the University of Melbourne in 2008. She studied whether collaborative teams of teachers using evidence-based decisions influenced student achievement. She was made a professor at Victoria University, Melbourne in 2012. Wu is sceptical about the importance of the National Assessment Program – Literacy and Numeracy (NAPLAN) and PISA results due to measurement errors acquired during collection of data. She is also concerned about the inferences that can be drawn from assessment data, such as using student performance to evaluate teacher performance. She believes that whilst teachers contribute to education, other factors are likely to be more important. After the data was published on the website My School, Wu began to speak up about the misuse of standardised testing. Her efforts resulted into an enquiry into the effectiveness of NAPLAN. Her findings were confirmed in 2018, when Les Perelman and Walt Haney reported that NAPLAN results of one million students should "be discarded".

In 1995, Wu began to concentrate on the development of Item Response Theory. She developed two item response software programs that analyse PISA and TIMSS data; ACER ConQuest (1998) and the R-package TAM (2010).

Wu's contributions to the Watterson estimator were uncovered by a team of undergraduate students led by Emilia Huerta-Sánchez (Brown University) and Rori Rohlfs (San Francisco State University). The students searched every issue of Theoretical Population Biology published between 1970 and 1990. She was one of several "acknowledged programmers", who were disproportionately women, who contributed significantly to highly cited manuscripts.
