= Allele Frequency Net Database =

Content
- Description: Online repository for immune gene frequencies in worldwide populations
- Organisms: Homo sapiens

Contact
- Research center: University of Liverpool
- Laboratory: Institute of Infection and Global Health
- Primary citation: PMID 21062830
- Release date: 2010

Access
- Website: http://www.allelefrequencies.net

The Allele Frequency Net Database (abbreviated AlFreD) is a database containing the allele frequencies of immune genes and their corresponding alleles in different populations.
