= Chung-I Wu =

Taiwanese biologist

Chung-I Wu (simplified Chinese: 吴仲义; traditional Chinese: 吳仲義; born 1954) is a Taiwanese biologist, academician of Academia Sinica, and former professor at the University of Chicago. He was also the second director of the Beijing Genomics Institute of the Chinese Academy of Sciences.

== Awards and honors ==
Wu has received awards throughout his career, including the NIH Research Career Development Award from 1990 to 1995, the Down Syndrome Foundation Award from 1989 to 1991, AAAS fellow in 2004, and the Outstanding Alumnus Award from Tunghai University in 2004. In 2004, he was also elected as an academician of Academia Sinica.

== Scientific studies ==
Chung-I Wu has made numerous contributions in the field of molecular evolution, population genetics, and evolutionary genomics, particularly in the genetic basis of speciation and natural selection. He pioneered the study of speciation at the molecular level, introducing cutting-edge gene replacement techniques to answer classical ecological questions in the model organism Drosophila. He also made original contributions in areas such as selfish genes, molecular clocks, X chromosome degeneration, and evolutionary genomics. His proposed hypotheses on the genetic mechanism of reproductive isolation and the gene concept of speciation are innovative and represent a significant departure from traditional ideas in species biology. He has published over 130 papers in top international journals such as Science, Nature, and PNAS, with 14 papers as corresponding author in Science, Nature, and Cell. In 2011, he received the second prize of the National Natural Science Award. He is currently the section editor of National Science Review.
