= Minor allele frequency =

Concept in genetics

Minor allele frequency (MAF) is the frequency at which the second most common allele occurs in a given population. They play a surprising role in heritability since MAF variants which occur only once, known as "singletons", drive an enormous amount of selection.

Single nucleotide polymorphisms (SNPs) with a minor allele frequency of 0.05 (5%) or greater were targeted by the HapMap project.

MAF is widely used in population genetics studies because it provides information to differentiate between common and rare variants in the population. As an example, a 2015 study sequenced the whole genomes of 2,120 Sardinian individuals. The authors classified the variants found in the study in three classes according to their MAF. It was observed that rare variants (MAF < 0.05) appeared more frequently in coding regions than common variants (MAF > 0.05) in this population.

== Interpreting MAF data ==
1. Introduce the reference of a SNP of interest, as an example: rs429358, in a database (dbSNP or other).

2. Find MAF/MinorAlleleCount link. MAF/MinorAlleleCount: C=0.1506/754 (1000 Genomes, where number of genomes sampled = N = 2504); where C is the minor allele for that particular locus; 0.1506 is the frequency of the C allele (MAF), i.e. 15% within the 1000 Genomes database; and 754 is the number of times this SNP has been observed in the population of the study. To find the number, note that $0.1506 = \frac{754}{2 \times 2504}$, where $2\times$ is to account for diploidy.

== See also ==
- Allele frequency
