= Star Beast (novel) =

Novel by Will Baker

Star Beast is a novel by Will Baker, published by Hodder & Stoughton in 1996.

== Plot summary ==
Star Beast is a novel set in a post-apocalyptic world in which humans have destroyed most of the Earth and now live in massive hive-like cities.

== Reception ==
Gideon Kibblewhite reviewed Star Beast for Arcane magazine, rating it an 8 out of 10 overall. Kibblewhite comments that "the world of the humans is paler and less interesting; so much so that it seems merely a vehicle for the intrigue from which the two heroes must escape. This is a shame, because this is why, for me, the book falls slightly short of its possibilities."

== Reviews ==
- Review by Andy Mills (1996) in Vector 188
