= Incomplete lineage sorting =

Characteristic of phylogenetic analysis

Incomplete lineage sorting (ILS) (also referred to as hemiplasy, deep coalescence, retention of ancestral polymorphism, or trans-species polymorphism) is a phenomenon in evolutionary biology and population genetics that results in discordance between species and gene trees. By contrast, complete lineage sorting results in concordant species and gene trees. ILS occurs in the context of a gene in an ancestral species which exists in multiple alleles. If a speciation event occurs in this situation, either complete lineage sorting will occur, and both daughter species will inherit all alleles of the gene in question, or incomplete lineage sorting will occur, when one or both daughter species inherits a subset of alleles present in the parental species. For example, if two alleles of a gene are present and a speciation event occurs, one of the two daughter species might inherit both alleles, but the second daughter species only inherits one of the two alleles. In this case, incomplete lineage sorting has occurred.

== Concept ==
Figure 1. Incomplete lineage sorting. G0 and G1 are alleles of a gene. See text for further details.

Figure 2. Apparent incomplete lineage sorting. An allele can be transferred from B to A either by hybridization or horizontal gene transfer. See text for more details.

The concept of incomplete lineage sorting has some important implications for phylogenetic techniques. The persistence of polymorphisms across different speciation events can cause incomplete lineage sorting. Suppose two subsequent speciation events occur where an ancestral species gives rise firstly to species A, and secondly to species B and C. When studying a single gene, it can have multiple versions (alleles) causing different characters to appear (polymorphisms). In the example shown in Figure 1, the gene G has two versions (alleles), G0 and G1. The ancestor of A, B and C originally had only one version of gene G, G0. At some point, a mutation occurred and the ancestral population became polymorphic, with some individuals having G0 and others G1. When species A split off, it retained only G1, while the ancestor of B and C remained polymorphic. When B and C diverged, B retained only G1 and C only G0; neither were now polymorphic in G. The tree for gene G shows A and B as sisters, whereas the species tree shows B and C as sisters. If the phylogeny of these species is based on gene G, it will not represent the actual relationships between the species. In other words, the most related species will not necessarily inherit the most related genes. This is of course a simplified example of incomplete lineage sorting, and in real research it is usually more complex containing more genes and species.

However, other mechanisms can lead to the same apparent discordancy, for example, alleles can move across species boundaries via hybridization, and DNA can be transferred between species by viruses. This is illustrated in Figure 2. Here the ancestor of A, B and C, and the ancestor of B and C, had only the G0 version of gene G. A mutation occurred at the divergence of B and C, and B acquired a mutated version, G1. Some time later, the arrow shows that G1 was transferred from B to A by some means (e.g. hybridization or horizontal gene transfer). Studying only the final states of G in the three species makes it appear that A and B are sisters rather than B and C, as in Figure 1, but in Figure 2 this is not caused by incomplete lineage sorting.

== Implications ==
Incomplete lineage sorting has important implications for phylogenetic research. There is a chance that when creating a phylogenetic tree it may not resemble actual relationships because of this incomplete lineage sorting. However, gene flow between lineages by hybridization or horizontal gene transfer may produce the same conflicting phylogenetic tree. Distinguishing these different processes may seem difficult, but much research and different statistical approaches are being developed to gain greater insight in these evolutionary dynamics. One of the resolutions to reduce the implications of incomplete lineage sorting is to use multiple genes for creating species or population phylogenies. The more genes used, the more reliable the phylogeny becomes.

== In diploid organisms ==
Incomplete lineage sorting commonly happens with sexual reproduction because the species cannot be traced back to a single individual or breeding pair. When organism tribe populations are large (i.e. thousands) each gene has some variation and the gene tree consists of other pre-existing lineages. In larger populations, ancestral lineages will persist for greater lengths of time. When very large ancestral populations are couples with closely-timed speciation events, these pieces of DNA with ancient distinct lineages retain conflicting affiliations, making it difficult to determine a common ancestor or points of branching.

== In primate evolution ==
Chimpanzees and bonobos are more related to each other than any other taxa and are thus sister taxa. Still, for 1.6% of the bonobo genome, sequences are more closely related to homologues of humans than to chimpanzees, which is probably a result of incomplete lineage sorting. A study of more than 23,000 DNA sequence alignments in the family Hominidae (great apes, including humans) showed that about 23% did not support the known sister relationship of chimpanzees and humans.

== In human evolution ==
In human evolution, incomplete lineage sorting is used to diagram hominin lineages that may have failed to sort out at the same time that speciation occurred in prehistory. Due to the advent of genetic testing and genome sequencing, researchers found that the genetic relationships between hominin lineages might disagree with previous understandings of their relatedness based on physical characteristics. Moreover, divergence of the last common ancestor (LCA) may not necessarily occur at the same time as speciation. Lineage sorting is a method that allows paleoanthropologists to explore the genetic relationships and divergences that may not fit with their previous speciation models based on morphological traits alone.

Incomplete lineage sorting of the human family tree is an area of great interest. There are a number of unknowns when considering both the transition from archaic humans to modern humans and divergence of the other great apes from the hominin lineage.

=== Ape and hominin / human divergence ===
Incomplete lineage sorting means that the average divergence time between genes may differ from the divergence time between species. Models suggest that the average divergence time between the genes in the human and chimpanzee genome is older than the split between humans and gorillas. What this means is the common ancestor of humans and chimpanzees has left traces of genetic material that was present in the common ancestor of humans, chimpanzees, and gorillas. However, the genetic tree slightly differs from that of the species or phylogeny tree. In the phylogeny tree when we look at the evolutionary relationship between the human, bonobo chimpanzee, and gorilla, the results show that the separation of bonobo and chimpanzee transpired in a close proximity of time to the common ancestor of the bonobo-chimpanzee ancestor and humans, indicating that humans and chimpanzees shared a common ancestor for several million years after separation from gorillas. This creates the phenomenon that is incomplete lineage sorting. Today researchers are relying on DNA fragments in order to study the evolutionary relationships among humans and their counterparts in the hope that it will provide information about speciation and ancestral processes from genomes from different types of humans.

== In viruses ==
Figure 3. The pretransmission interval and incomplete lineage sorting in the phylogeny of a human-transmissible virus. The shaded tree represents a transmission chain where each region represents the pathogen population in each of three patients. The width of the shaded regions corresponds to the genetic diversity. In this scenario, A infects B with an imperfect transmission bottleneck, and then B infects C. The genealogy at the bottom is reconstructed from a sample of a single lineage from each patient at three distinct time points. When diversity exists in donor A, a pre-transmission interval will occur at each inferred transmission event (MRCA(A,B) precedes transmission from A to B), and the order of transmission events may become randomized in the virus genealogy. Note that the pre-transmission interval also is a random variable defined by the donor's diversity at time of each transmission. Terminal branch lengths are also elongated due to these processes.

Incomplete lineage sorting is a common feature in viral phylodynamics, where the phylogeny represented by transmission of a disease from one person to the next, which is to say the population level tree, often doesn't correspond to the tree created from a genetic analysis due to the population bottlenecks that are an inherent feature of viral transmission of disease. Figure 3 illustrates how this can occur. This has relevance to criminal transmission of HIV where in some criminal cases, a phylogenetic analysis of one or two genes from the strains from the accused and the victim have been used to infer transmission; however, the commonality of incomplete lineage sorting means that transmission cannot be inferred solely on the basis of such a basic analysis.

== In linguistics ==
Jacques and List (2019) show that the concept of incomplete lineage sorting can be applied to account for non-treelike phenomena in language evolution. Kalyan and François (2019), proponents of the method of historical glottometry, a model challenging the applicability of the tree model in historical linguistics, concur that "Historical Glottometry does not challenge the family tree model once incomplete lineage sorting has been taken into account."

== See also ==
- Gibbon–human last common ancestor
- Laggar falcon
- Coalescent theory
- Multispecies coalescent process
- Lineage (evolution)
