= Genetic hitchhiking =

Phenomenon in biology

Genetic hitchhiking, also called genetic draft or the hitchhiking effect, is when an allele changes frequency not because it itself is under natural selection, but because it is near another gene that is undergoing a selective sweep and that is on the same DNA chain. When one gene goes through a selective sweep, any other nearby polymorphisms that are in linkage disequilibrium will tend to change their allele frequencies too. Selective sweeps happen when newly appeared (and hence still rare) mutations are advantageous and increase in frequency. Neutral or even slightly deleterious alleles that happen to be close by on the chromosome 'hitchhike' along with the sweep. In contrast, effects on a neutral locus due to linkage disequilibrium with newly appeared deleterious mutations are called background selection. Both genetic hitchhiking and background selection are stochastic (random) evolutionary forces, like genetic drift.

== History ==
The term hitchhiking was coined in 1974 by Maynard Smith and John Haigh. Subsequently the phenomenon was studied by John H. Gillespie and others.

== Outcomes ==
Hitchhiking occurs when a polymorphism is in linkage disequilibrium with a second locus that is undergoing a selective sweep. The allele that is linked to the adaptation will increase in frequency, in some cases until it becomes fixed in the population. The other allele, which is linked to the non-advantageous version, will decrease in frequency, in some cases until extinction. Overall, hitchhiking reduces the amount of genetic variation. A hitchhiker mutation (or passenger mutation in cancer biology) may itself be neutral, advantageous, or deleterious.

Recombination can interrupt the process of genetic hitchhiking, ending it before the hitchhiking neutral or deleterious allele becomes fixed or goes extinct. The closer a hitchhiking polymorphism is to the gene under selection, the less opportunity there is for recombination to occur. This leads to a reduction in genetic variation near a selective sweep that is closer to the selected site. This pattern is useful for using population data to detect selective sweeps, and hence to detect which genes have been under very recent selection.

== Draft versus drift ==
Both genetic drift and genetic draft are random evolutionary processes, i.e. they act stochastically and in a way that is not correlated with selection at the gene in question. Drift is the change in the frequency of an allele in a population due to random sampling in each generation. Draft is the change in the frequency of an allele due to the randomness of what other non-neutral alleles it happens to be found in association with.

Assuming genetic drift is the only evolutionary force acting on an allele, after one generation in many replicated idealised populations each of size N, each starting with allele frequencies of p and q, the newly added variance in allele frequency across those populations (i.e. the degree of randomness of the outcome) is $\frac{pq}{2N}$. This equation shows that the effect of genetic drift is heavily dependent on population size, defined as the actual number of individuals in an idealised population. Genetic draft results in similar behavior to the equation above, but with an effective population size that may have no relationship to the actual number of individuals in the population. Instead, the effective population size may depend on factors such as the recombination rate and the frequency and strength of beneficial mutations. The increase in variance between replicate populations due to drift is independent, whereas with draft it is autocorrelated, i.e. if an allele frequency goes up because of genetic drift, that contains no information about the next generation, whereas if it goes up because of genetic draft, it is more likely to go up than down in the next generation. Genetic draft generates a different allele frequency spectrum to genetic drift.

== Applications ==
=== Sex chromosomes ===
The Y chromosome does not undergo recombination, making it particularly prone to the fixation of deleterious mutations via hitchhiking. This has been proposed as an explanation as to why there are so few functional genes on the Y chromosome.

=== Mutator evolution ===
Hitchhiking is necessary for the evolution of higher mutation rates to be favored by natural selection on evolvability. A hypothetical mutator M increases the general mutation rate in the area around it. Due to the increased mutation rate, the nearby A allele may be mutated into a new, advantageous allele, A*

--M------A-- -> --M------A*--

The individual in which this chromosome lies will now have a selective advantage over other individuals of this species, so the allele A* will spread through the population by the normal processes of natural selection. M, due to its proximity to A*, will be dragged through into the general population. This process only works when M is very close to the allele it has mutated. A greater distance would increase the chance of recombination separating M from A*, leaving M alone with any deleterious mutations it may have caused. For this reason, evolution of mutators is generally expected to happen largely in asexual species where recombination cannot disrupt linkage disequilibrium.

=== Neutral theory of molecular evolution ===
The neutral theory of molecular evolution assumes that most new mutations are either deleterious (and quickly purged by selection) or else neutral, with very few being adaptive. It also assumes that the behavior of neutral allele frequencies can be described by the mathematics of genetic drift. Genetic hitchhiking has therefore been viewed as a major challenge to neutral theory, and an explanation for why genome-wide versions of the McDonald–Kreitman test appear to indicate a high proportion of mutations becoming fixed for reasons connected to selection.
