= Selective sweep =

Genetic process

In genetics, a selective sweep is the process through which a new beneficial mutation that increases its frequency and becomes fixed (i.e., reaches a frequency of 1) in a population leads to the reduction or elimination of genetic variation among nucleotide sequences that are near the mutation site. In selective sweeps, positive selection causes the new mutation to reach fixation so quickly that linked alleles can "hitchhike" and also become fixed.

== Overview ==
A selective sweep can occur when a rare or previously non-existing allele that increases the fitness of the carrier (relative to other members of the population) increases rapidly in frequency across the population due to natural selection. As the prevalence of such a beneficial allele increases, genetic variants that happen to be present on the genomic background (the DNA neighborhood) of the beneficial allele will also become more prevalent, referred to as genetic hitchhiking. A selective sweep due to a strongly selected allele, which arose on a single genomic background, therefore results in a region of the genome with a large reduction of genetic variation in that chromosome region.

Sweeps leave different patterns of reduced genetic variation depending on origin of allele and number of haplotypes reaching fixation. Sweeps can be categorised into three main categories:

1. The "classic selective sweep" or "hard selective sweep" is expected to occur when a single haplotype is fixed at the locus under selection. This single haplotype can be de novo or initially rare within the population, but once a beneficial mutation occurs, it increases in frequency rapidly, thereby drastically reducing genetic variation.
2. The "soft sweep" encompasses a broader range of adaptive patterns but often refer to increases in beneficial alleles across multiple haplotypes previously present (and neutral) within the population. As soft sweeps arise from standing variation, the mutation may be present on several genomic backgrounds so that when it rapidly increases in frequency, a higher genetic diversity is maintained.
3. Finally, a "multiple origin soft sweep" occurs when mutations are common (for example in a large population) so that the same or similar beneficial mutations occur on different genomic backgrounds such that no single genomic background can hitchhike to high frequency.

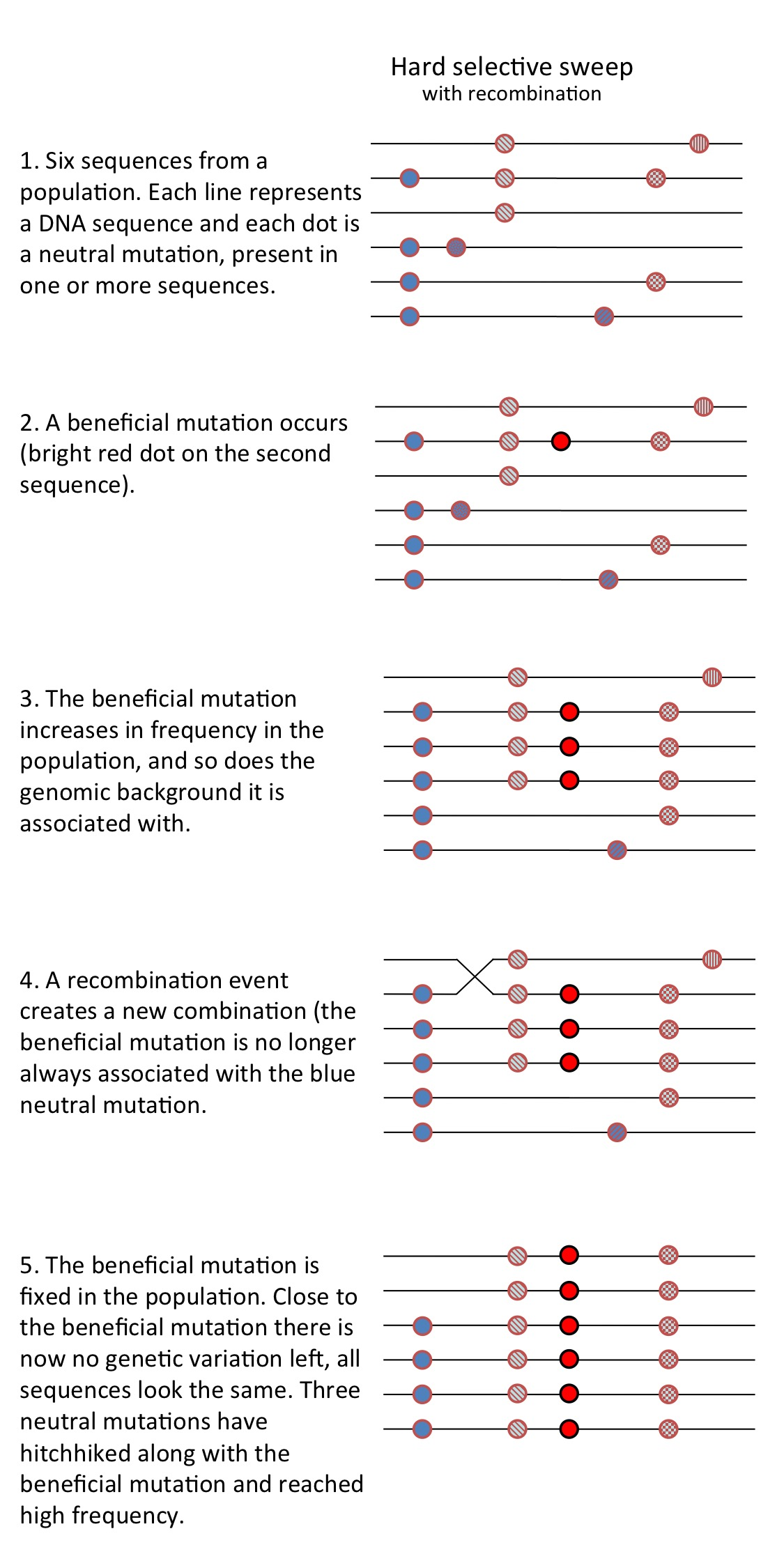
This is a diagram of a hard selective sweep. It shows the different steps (a beneficial mutation occurs, increases in frequency and fixes in a population) and the effect on nearby genetic variation.

Sweeps do not occur when selection simultaneously causes very small shifts in allele frequencies at many loci each with standing variation (polygenic adaptation).

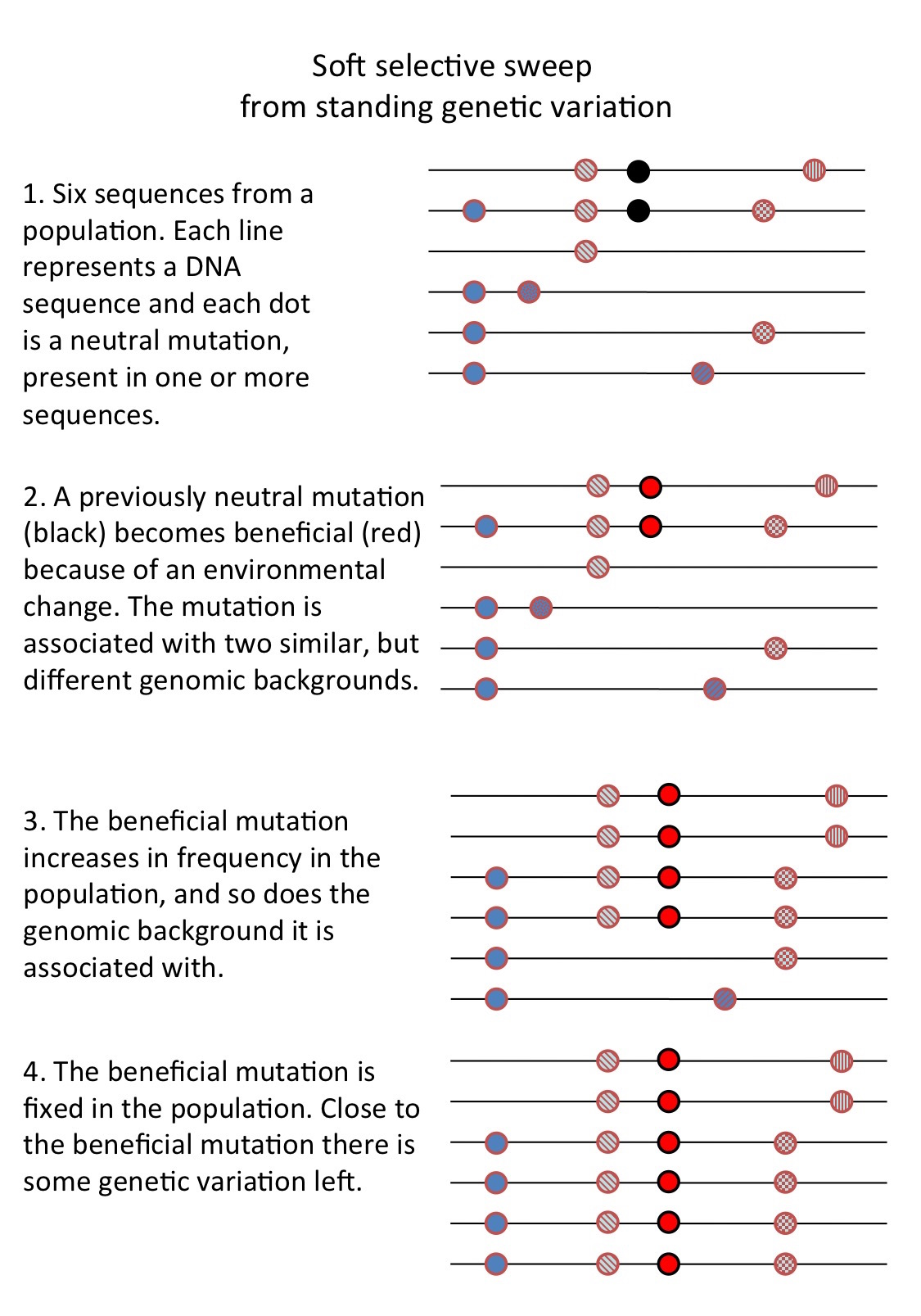
This is a diagram of a soft selective sweep from standing genetic variation. It shows the different steps (a neutral mutation becomes beneficial, increases in frequency and fixes in a population) and the effect on nearby genetic variation.

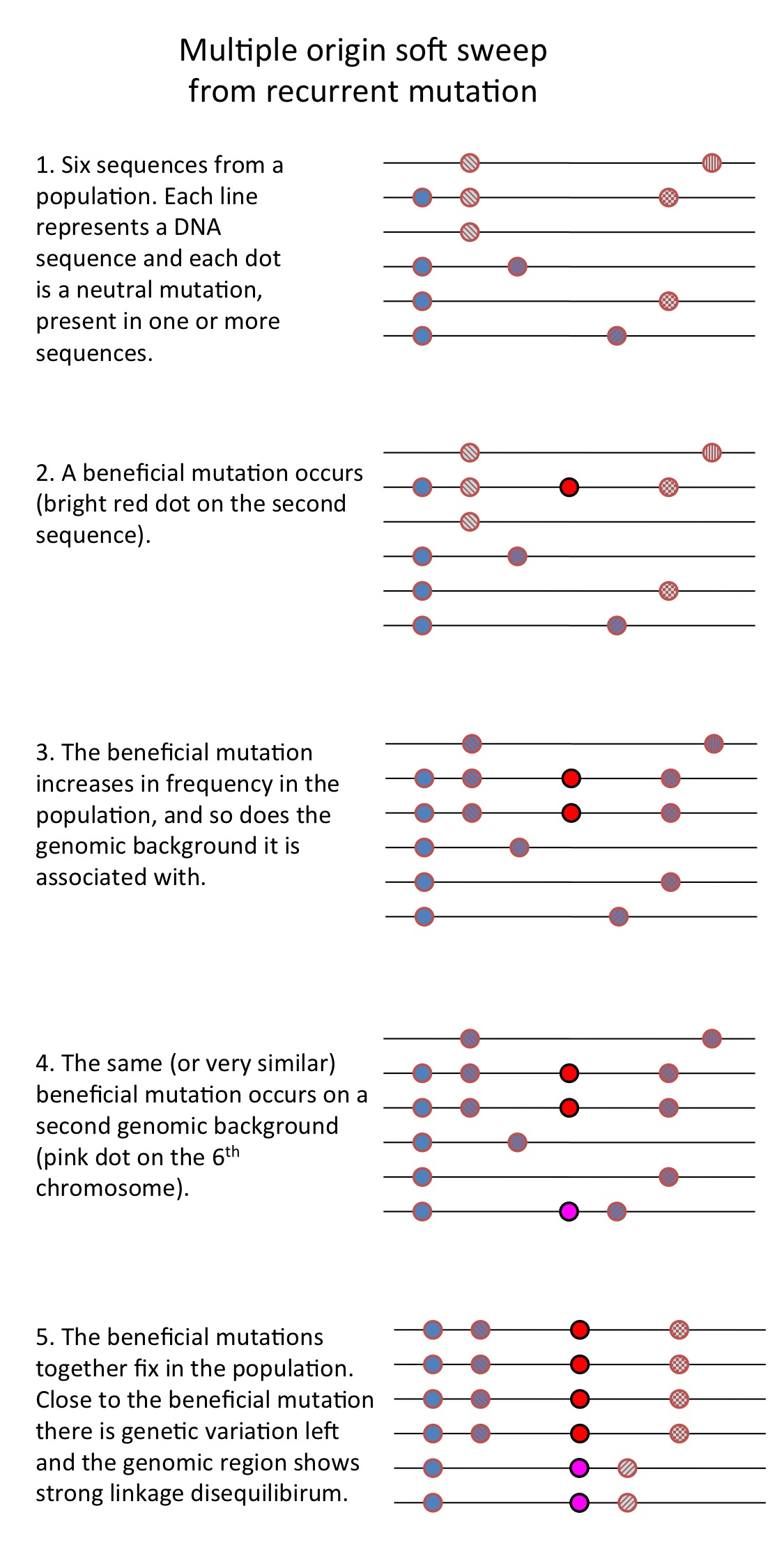
This is a diagram of a multiple origin soft selective sweep from recurrent mutation. It shows the different steps (a beneficial mutation occurs and increases in frequency, but before it fixes the same mutation occur again on a second genomic background, together, the mutations fix in the population) and the effect on nearby genetic variation.

== Detection ==
The interaction between beneficial mutations and nearby linked neutral variation was first proposed by John Maynard-Smith and John Haigh in 1974. They established that selective sweeps leave distinct localised signatures in genomic regions flanking the site under selection. Modern genomic techniques have significantly advanced out ability to detect these signatures.

=== Linkage Disequilibrium (LD) ===
Linkage disequilibrium refers to association of genes in a population that is causes a given haplotype to be overrepresented in the population. Under neutral evolution, genetic recombination will result in the reshuffling of the different alleles within a haplotype, and no single haplotype will dominate the population. However, during a selective sweep, selection for a positively selected gene variant will also result in selection of neighbouring alleles and less opportunity for recombination. Therefore, the presence of strong linkage disequilibrium might indicate that there has been a recent selective sweep, and can be used to identify sites recently under selection.

There have been many scans for selective sweeps in humans and other species, using a variety of statistical approaches and assumptions.

In maize, a recent comparison of yellow and white corn genotypes surrounding Y1—the phytoene synthetase gene responsible for the yellow endosperm color, shows strong evidence for a selective sweep in yellow germplasm reducing diversity at this locus and linkage disequilibrium in surrounding regions. White maize lines had increased diversity and no evidence of linkage disequilibrium associated with a selective sweep.

=== Site Frequency Spectrum (SFS) ===
Sweeps result in a detectable difference in the prevalence of high and low frequency derived variants near the site of selection. This trend arises as neutral sites linked to the swept haplotype will increase in frequency, whereas the variants further from the beneficial mutation (and therefore not linked) will decrease in frequency, creating very distinct patterns.

When using SFS based scans, an average background SFS is estimated, which is then compared to the SFS of regions expected to have been under a selective sweep.

=== Effectiveness of Detection ===
There have been many scans proposed over the years to effectively detect selective sweeps in humans and other species, using a variety of statistical approaches and assumptions. These detection tools (such as SweepFinder, SweeD, OmegaPlus) have been discussed in terms of relability and detection power, with no consensus in the field on what is the most reliable method.

Factors such as background selection (BGS), effective population size (Ne), and population structure (such as fragmentation, bottlenecks and migration) have all been discussed while evaluating the effectiveness of detection methods, as most tools to not consider all in their predictions.

== Relevance to disease ==
Because selective sweeps allow for rapid adaptation, they have been cited as a key factor in the ability of pathogenic bacteria and viruses to attack their hosts and survive the medicines we use to treat them. In such systems, the competition between host and parasite is often characterized as an evolutionary "arms race", so the more rapidly one organism can change its method of attack or defense, the better. This has elsewhere been described by the Red Queen hypothesis. Needless to say, a more effective pathogen or a more resistant host will have an adaptive advantage over its conspecifics, providing the fuel for a selective sweep.

One example comes from the human influenza virus, which has been involved in an adaptive contest with humans for hundreds of years. While antigenic drift (the gradual change of surface antigens) is considered the traditional model for changes in the viral genotype, recent evidence suggests that selective sweeps play an important role as well. In several flu populations, the time to the most recent common ancestor (TMRCA) of "sister" strains, an indication of relatedness, suggested that they had all evolved from a common progenitor within just a few years. Periods of low genetic diversity, presumably resultant from genetic sweeps, gave way to increasing diversity as different strains adapted to their own locales.

A similar case can be found in Toxoplasma gondii, a potent protozoan parasite capable of infecting warm-blooded animals. T. gondii was recently discovered to exist in only three clonal lineages in all of Europe and North America. In other words, there are only three genetically distinct strains of this parasite in all of the Old World and much of the New World. These three strains are characterized by a single monomorphic version of the gene Chr1a, which emerged at approximately the same time as the three modern clones. It appears then, that a novel genotype emerged containing this form of Chr1a and swept the entire European and North American population of Toxoplasma gondii, bringing with it the rest of its genome via genetic hitchhiking. The South American strains of T. gondii, of which there are far more than exist elsewhere, also carry this allele of Chr1a.

== Involvement in agriculture and domestication ==
Rarely are genetic variability and its opposing forces, including adaptation, more relevant than in the generation of domestic and agricultural species. Cultivated crops, for example, have essentially been genetically modified for more than ten thousand years, subjected to artificial selective pressures, and forced to adapt rapidly to new environments. Selective sweeps provide a baseline from which different varietals could have emerged.

For example, recent study of the corn (Zea mays) genotype uncovered dozens of ancient selective sweeps uniting modern cultivars on the basis of shared genetic data possibly dating back as far as domestic corn's wild counterpart, teosinte. In other words, though artificial selection has shaped the genome of corn into a number of distinctly adapted cultivars, selective sweeps acting early in its development provide a unifying homoplasy of genetic sequence. In a sense, the long-buried sweeps may give evidence of corn's, and teosinte's, ancestral state by elucidating a common genetic background between the two.

Another example of the role of selective sweeps in domestication comes from the chicken. A Swedish research group recently used parallel sequencing techniques to examine eight cultivated varieties of chicken and their closest wild ancestor with the goal of uncovering genetic similarities resultant from selective sweeps. They managed to uncover evidence of several selective sweeps, most notably in the gene responsible for thyroid-stimulating hormone receptor (TSHR), which regulates the metabolic and photoperiod-related elements of reproduction. What this suggests is that, at some point in the domestication of the chicken, a selective sweep, probably driven by human intervention, subtly changed the reproductive machinery of the bird, presumably to the advantage of its human manipulators.

== In humans ==
Examples of selective sweeps in humans are in variants affecting lactase persistence, and adaptation to high altitudes.

== See also ==
- International HapMap Project
- Hill-Robertson effect
- Soft selective sweep
