= Agrisera =

Swedish antibody producer

Agrisera AB
- Company type: Aktiebolag
- Industry: Biotech, Life Science
- Founded: 1985
- Key people: Erika Gelfgren (CEO), Greger Nordlund (Founder), Fredrik Netzel (Chairman of the Board)
- Products: Research antibodies for plant science
- Revenue: ▲48.5m SEK (2021)
- Number of employees: 42 (2022)
- Website: www.agrisera.com

Agrisera (also known as Agrisera antibodies) is a Swedish plant and algal antibody producer, established in 1985.

== History ==
Agrisera was founded in 1985, as a small-scale producer of polyclonal and monoclonal antibodies for research. In 1999, the company advanced from exclusively offering custom antibody production, to also creating a catalog of ready-made antibodies, primarily to plant and algal proteins. Agrisera launched its online antibody shop in 2003, and has since grown to be a leading supplier of antibodies for plant research, with customers and distributors in over 60 countries. The development of many of the antibodies that Agrisera offers, has been done in close collaboration with research groups around the world. Agrisera was awarded as the Plant Science Antibody Supplier of the Year in 2019, by CiteAb, for being the company with the most antibody citations in research related to plant science. Agrisera also collaborates with SciGrafik and leading plant scientists, including Professor Govindjee, a pioneer in the field of photosynthesis, to provide the scientific community with free, educational resources related to plant science.

In 2020, Agrisera was acquired by Olink. Olink Proteomics devised the Proximity extension assay (PEA) technology, a protein biomarker research tool used across a broad range of applications in academic/clinical research and drug development. In July 2024, Thermo Fisher Scientific acquired Olink.

== Awards ==
Plant Science Antibody Supplier of the Year (2019)
