= HRR =

HRR may refer to:

- Haploid-relative-risk, a method for determining gene allele association to a disease
- Hardy, Rand & Rittler pseudoisochromatic plates, a type of color vision test
- Harrington railway station, in England
- Healy River Airport, in Alaska, United States
- Heart rate reserve
- Henley Royal Regatta
- High refresh rate, 120Hz or higher
- Hirzebruch–Riemann–Roch theorem
- Historicorum Romanorum reliquiae, a collection of ancient fragmentary Latin history-works
- The History of Rock and Roll, a radio documentary
- Holy Roman Empire (German: Heiliges Römisches Reich)
- Homologous recombination repair, a major DNA repair pathway that mainly acts on double-strand breaks and interstrand crosslinks
- Hondo Railway, an American railway
- Horuru language, dialect of Yalahatan, spoken in Indonesia ISO 639-3 code hrr
- HRR, a Rockwell scale of materials' hardness
