= Marker-assisted selection =

Indirect selection process in breeding

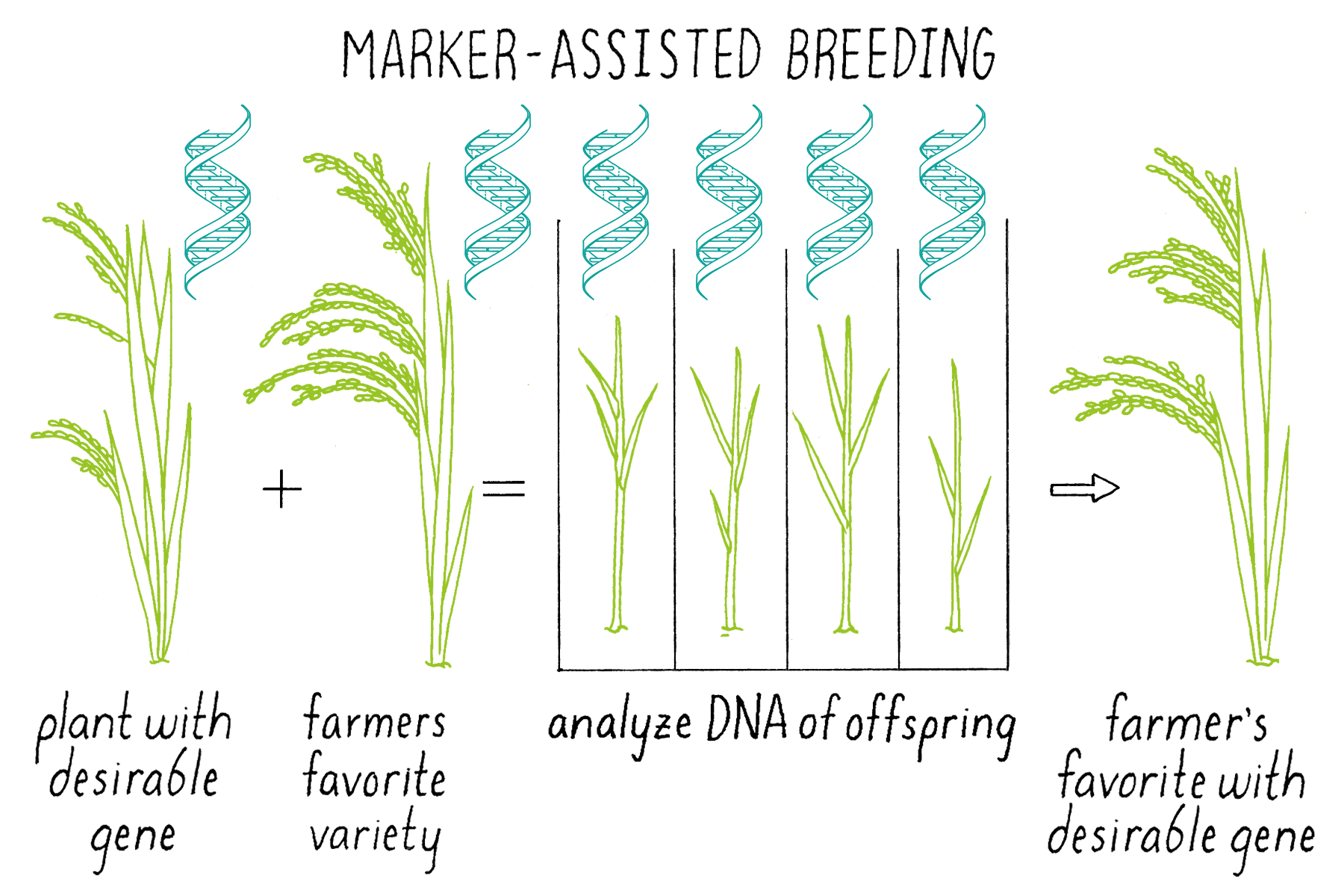
A modern method of plant breeding that uses DNA analysis to identify desired or undesired gene(s) in seedlings, making it more precise and faster than conventional breeding.

Marker assisted selection or marker aided selection (MAS) is an indirect selection process where a trait of interest is selected based on a marker (morphological, biochemical or DNA/RNA variation) linked to a trait of interest (e.g. productivity, disease resistance, abiotic stress tolerance, and quality), rather than on the trait itself. This process has been extensively researched and proposed for plant- and animal- breeding.

For example, using MAS to select individuals with disease resistance involves identifying a marker allele that is linked with disease resistance rather than the level of disease resistance. The assumption is that the marker associates at high frequency with the gene or quantitative trait locus (QTL) of interest, due to genetic linkage (close proximity, on the chromosome, of the marker locus and the disease resistance-determining locus). MAS can be useful to select for traits that are difficult or expensive to measure, exhibit low heritability and/or are expressed late in development. At certain points in the breeding process the specimens are examined to ensure that they express the desired trait.

== Marker types ==
The majority of MAS work in the present era uses DNA-based markers. However, the first markers that allowed indirect selection of a trait of interest were morphological markers. In 1923, Karl Sax first reported association of a simply inherited genetic marker with a quantitative trait in plants when he observed segregation of seed size associated with segregation for a seed coat color marker in beans (Phaseolus vulgaris L.). In 1935, J. Rasmusson demonstrated linkage of flowering time (a quantitative trait) in peas with a simply inherited gene for flower color.

Markers may be:

- Morphological — These were the first markers loci available that have an obvious impact on the morphology of plants. These markers are often detectable by eye, by simple visual inspection. Examples of this type of marker include the presence or absence of an awn, leaf sheath coloration, height, grain color, aroma of rice etc. In well-characterized crops like maize, tomato, pea, barley or wheat, tens or hundreds of genes that determine morphological traits have been mapped to specific chromosome locations.
- Biochemical — A protein that can be extracted and observed; for example, isozymes and storage proteins.
- Cytological — Cytological markers are chromosomal features that can be identified through microscopy. These generally take the form of chromosome bands, regions of chromatin that become impregnated with specific dyes used in cytology. The presence or absence of a chromosome band can be correlated with a particular trait, indicating that the locus responsible for the trait is located within or near (tightly linked) to the banded region. Morphological and cytological markers formed the backbone of early genetic studies in crops such as wheat and maize.
- DNA-based — Including microsatellites (also known as short tandem repeats, STRs, or simple sequence repeats, SSRs), restriction fragment length polymorphism (RFLP), random amplification of polymorphic DNA (RAPD), amplified fragment length polymorphism (AFLP), and single nucleotide polymorphisms (SNPs).

== Positive and negative selectable markers ==
The following terms are generally less relevant to discussions of MAS in plant and animal breeding, but are highly relevant in molecular biology research:

- Positive selectable markers are selectable markers that confer selective advantage to the host organism. An example would be antibiotic resistance, which allows the host organism to survive antibiotic selection.
- Negative selectable markers are selectable markers that eliminate or inhibit growth of the host organism upon selection. An example would be thymidine kinase, which makes the host sensitive to ganciclovir selection.

A distinction can be made between selectable markers (which eliminate certain genotypes from the population) and screenable markers (which cause certain genotypes to be readily identifiable, at which point the experimenter must "score" or evaluate the population and act to retain the preferred genotypes). Most MAS uses screenable markers rather than selectable markers.

== Gene vs marker ==
The gene of interest directly causes production of protein(s) or RNA that produce a desired trait or phenotype, whereas markers (a DNA sequence or the morphological or biochemical markers produced due to that DNA) are genetically linked to the gene of interest. The gene of interest and the marker tend to move together during segregation of gametes due to their proximity on the same chromosome and concomitant reduction in recombination (chromosome crossover events) between the marker and gene of interest. For some traits, the gene of interest has been discovered and the presence of desirable alleles can be directly assayed with a high level of confidence. However, if the gene of interest is not known, markers linked to the gene of interest can still be used to select for individuals with desirable alleles of the gene of interest. When markers are used there may be some inaccurate results due to inaccurate tests for the marker. There also can be false positive results when markers are used, due to recombination between the marker of interest and gene (or QTL). A perfect marker would elicit no false positive results. The term 'perfect marker' is sometimes used when tests are performed to detect a SNP or other DNA polymorphism in the gene of interest, if that SNP or other polymorphism is the direct cause of the trait of interest. The term 'marker' is still appropriate to use when directly assaying the gene of interest, because the test of genotype is an indirect test of the trait or phenotype of interest.

== Important properties of ideal markers for MAS ==
An ideal marker:

- Has easy recognition of phenotypes - ideally all possible phenotypes (homo- and heterozygotes) from all possible alleles
- Demonstrates measurable differences in expression between trait types or gene of interest alleles, early in the development of the organism
- Testing for the marker does not have variable success depending on the allele at the marker locus or the allele at the target locus (the gene of interest that determines the trait of interest).
- Low or null interaction among the markers allowing the use of many at the same time in a segregating population
- Abundant in number
- Polymorphic

== Drawbacks of morphological markers ==
Morphological markers are associated with several general deficits that reduce their usefulness including:

- the delay of marker expression until late into the development of the organism
- allowing dominance to mask the underlying genetics
- pleiotropy, which does not allow easy and parsimonious inferences to be drawn from one gene to one trait
- confounding effects of genes unrelated to the gene or trait of interest but which also affect the morphological marker (epistasis)
- frequent confounding effects of environmental factors which affect the morphological characteristics of the organism

To avoid problems specific to morphological markers, DNA-based markers have been developed. They are highly polymorphic, exhibit simple inheritance (often codominant), are abundant throughout the genome, are easy and fast to detect, exhibit minimum pleiotropic effects, and detection is not dependent on the developmental stage of the organism. Numerous markers have been mapped to different chromosomes in several crops including rice, wheat, maize, soybean and several others, and in livestock such as cattle, pigs and chickens. Those markers have been used in diversity analysis, parentage detection, DNA fingerprinting, and prediction of hybrid performance. Molecular markers are useful in indirect selection processes, enabling manual selection of individuals for further propagation.

== Selection for major genes linked to markers ==
'Major genes' that are responsible for economically important characteristics are frequent in the plant kingdom. Such characteristics include disease resistance, male sterility, self-incompatibility, and others related to shape, color, and architecture of whole plants and are often of mono- or oligogenic in nature. The marker loci that are tightly linked to major genes can be used for selection and are sometimes more efficient than direct selection for the target gene. Such advantages in efficiency may be due for example, to higher expression of the marker mRNA in such cases that the marker is itself a gene. Alternatively, in such cases that the target gene of interest differs between two alleles by a difficult-to-detect single nucleotide polymorphism, an external marker (be it another gene or a polymorphism that is easier to detect, such as a short tandem repeat) may present as the most realistic option.

== Situations that are favorable for molecular marker selection ==
There are several indications for the use of molecular markers in the selection of a genetic trait.

Situations such as:

- The selected character is expressed late in plant development, like fruit and flower features or adult characters with a juvenile period (so that it is not necessary to wait for the organism to become fully developed before arrangements can be made for propagation)
- The expression of the target gene is recessive (so that individuals which are heterozygous positive for the recessive allele can be crossed to produce some homozygous offspring with the desired trait)
- There are special conditions for expression of the target gene(s), as in the case of breeding for disease and pest resistance (where inoculation with the disease or subjection to pests would otherwise be required). Sometimes inoculation methods are unreliable and sometimes field inoculation with the pathogen is not even allowed for safety reasons. Moreover, sometimes expression is dependent on environmental conditions.
- The phenotype is affected by two or more unlinked genes (epistatis). For example, selection for multiple genes which provide resistance against diseases or insect pests for gene pyramiding.

The cost of genotyping (for example, the molecular marker assays needed here) is decreasing thus increasing the attractiveness of MAS as the development of the technology continues. (Additionally, the cost of phenotyping performed by a human is a labor burden, which is higher in a developed country and increasing in a developing country.)

== Steps for MAS ==
Generally the first step is to map the gene or quantitative trait locus (QTL) of interest first by using different techniques and then using this information for marker assisted selection. Generally, the markers to be used should be close to gene of interest (<5 recombination unit or cM) in order to ensure that only minor fraction of the selected individuals will be recombinants. Generally, not only a single marker but rather two markers are used in order to reduce the chances of an error due to homologous recombination. For example, if two flanking markers are used at same time with an interval between them of approximately 20cM, there is higher probability (99%) for recovery of the target gene.

== QTL mapping techniques ==
In plants QTL mapping is generally achieved using bi-parental cross populations; a cross between two parents which have a contrasting phenotype for the trait of interest are developed. Commonly used populations are near isogenic lines (NILs), recombinant inbred lines (RILs), doubled haploids (DH), back cross and F_{2}. Linkage between the phenotype and markers which have already been mapped is tested in these populations in order to determine the position of the QTL. Such techniques are based on linkage and are therefore referred to as "linkage mapping".

== Single step MAS and QTL mapping ==
In contrast to two-step QTL mapping and MAS, a single-step method for breeding typical plant populations has been developed.

In such an approach, in the first few breeding cycles, markers linked to the trait of interest are identified by QTL mapping and later the same information is used in the same population. In this approach, pedigree structure is created from families that are created by crossing number of parents (in three-way or four way crosses). Both phenotyping and genotyping is done using molecular markers mapped the possible location of QTL of interest. This will identify markers and their favorable alleles. Once these favorable marker alleles are identified, the frequency of such alleles will be increased and response to marker assisted selection is estimated. Marker allele(s) with desirable effect will be further used in next selection cycle or other experiments.

== High-throughput genotyping techniques ==
Recently high-throughput genotyping techniques are developed which allows marker aided screening of many genotypes. This will help breeders in shifting traditional breeding to marker aided selection. One example of such automation is using DNA isolation robots, capillary electrophoresis and pipetting robots.

One recent example of capllilary system is Applied Biosystems 3130 Genetic Analyzer. This is the latest generation of 4-capillary electrophoresis instruments for the low to medium throughput laboratories.

High-throughput MAS is needed for crop breeding because current techniques are not cost effective. Arrays have been developed for rice by Masouleh et al 2009; wheat by Berard et al 2009, Bernardo et al 2015, and Rasheed et al 2016; legumes by Varshney et al 2016; and various other crops, but all of these have also problems with customization, cost, flexibility, and equipment costs.

== Use of MAS for backcross breeding ==
A minimum of five or six-backcross generations are required to transfer a gene of interest from a donor (may not be adapted) to a recipient (recurrent – adapted cultivar). The recovery of the recurrent genotype can be accelerated with the use of molecular markers. If the F1 is heterozygous for the marker locus, individuals with the recurrent parent allele(s) at the marker locus in first or subsequent backcross generations will also carry a chromosome tagged by the marker.

== Marker assisted gene pyramiding ==
Gene pyramiding has been proposed and applied to enhance resistance to disease and insects by selecting for two or more than two genes at a time. For example, in rice such pyramids have been developed against bacterial blight and blast. The advantage of use of markers in this case allows to select for QTL-allele-linked markers that have same phenotypic effect.

MAS has also been proved useful for livestock improvement.

A coordinated effort to implement wheat (Durum (Triticum turgidum) and common wheat (Triticum aestivum)) marker assisted selection in the U.S. as well as a resource for marker assisted selection exists at the Wheat CAP (Coordinated Agricultural Project) website.

== See also ==
- Association mapping
- Family based QTL mapping
- Genomics of domestication
- History of plant breeding
- Molecular breeding
- Nested association mapping
- QTL mapping
- Selection methods in plant breeding based on mode of reproduction
- Smart breeding
