= Molecular breeding =

Use of molecular biology tools

Molecular breeding is the application of molecular biology tools, often in plant breeding and animal breeding. In the broad sense, molecular breeding can be defined as the use of genetic manipulation performed at the level of DNA to improve traits of interest in plants and animals, and it may also include genetic engineering or gene manipulation, molecular marker-assisted selection, and genomic selection. More often, however, molecular breeding implies molecular marker-assisted breeding (MAB) and is defined as the application of molecular biotechnologies, specifically molecular markers, in combination with linkage maps and genomics, to alter and improve plant or animal traits on the basis of genotypic assays.

The areas of molecular breeding include:

- QTL mapping or gene discovery
- Marker assisted selection and genomic selection
- Genetic engineering
- Genetic transformation

== Constituent methods ==
=== Marker assisted breeding ===
Methods in marker assisted breeding include:

==== Genotyping and creating molecular maps - genomics ====
The commonly used markers include simple sequence repeats (or microsatellites), single nucleotide polymorphisms (SNP). The process of identification of plant genotypes is known as genotyping.

Development of SNPs has revolutionized the molecular breeding process as it helps to create dense markers. Another area that is developing is genotyping by sequencing.

==== Phenotyping - phenomics ====
To identify genes associated with traits, it is important to measure the trait value - known as phenotype. The "omics" for measurement of phenotypes is called phenomics. The phenotype can be indicative of the measurement of the trait itself or an indirectly related or correlated trait.

==== QTL mapping or association mapping ====
Genes (Quantitative trait loci (abbreviated as QTL) or quantitative trait genes or minor genes or major genes) involved in controlling trait of interest are identified. The process is known as mapping. Mapping of such genes can be done using molecular markers. QTL mapping can involve single large family, unrelated individuals or multiple families (see: Family based QTL mapping). The basic idea is to identify genes or markers associated with genes that correlate to a phenotypic measurement and that can be used in marker assisted breeding / selection.

==== Marker assisted selection or genetic selection ====
Once genes or markers are identified, they can be used for genotyping and selection decisions can be made.

==== Marker-assisted backcrossing (MABC) ====
Backcrossing is crossing an F1 with its parents to transfer a limited number of loci (e.g. transgene, disease resistance loci, etc.) from one genetic background to another. Usually the recipient of such genes is a cultivar that is already well performing - except for the gene that is to be transferred. So we want to keep the genetic background of the recipient genotypes, which is done by 4-6 rounds of repeated backcrosses while selecting for the gene of interest. We can use markers from the whole genome to recover the genome quickly in 2-3 rounds of backcrossing might be good enough in such situation.

==== Genomic selection ====
Genomic selection is a novel approach to traditional marker-assisted selection where selection is made based on only a few markers. Rather than seeking to identify individual loci significantly associated with a trait, genomics uses all marker data as predictors of performance and consequently delivers more accurate predictions. Selection can be based on genomic selection predictions, potentially leading to more rapid and lower cost gains from breeding. Genomic prediction combines marker data with phenotypic and pedigree data (when available) in an attempt to increase the accuracy of the prediction of breeding and genotypic values.

=== Genetic transformation or Genetic engineering ===
Transfer of genes makes possible the horizontal transfer of genes from one organism to another. Thus plants can receive genes from humans or algae or any other organism. This provides limitless opportunities in breeding crop plants.

== By organism ==
Molecular breeding resources (including multiomics data) are available for:

- Some of the millets
- Wheat
