= Inclusive composite interval mapping =

In statistical genetics, inclusive composite interval mapping (ICIM) has been proposed as an approach to QTL (quantitative trait locus) mapping for populations derived from bi-parental crosses. QTL mapping is based on genetic linkage map and phenotypic data to attempt to locate individual genetic factors on chromosomes and to estimate their genetic effects.

== Additive and dominance QTL mapping ==
Two genetic assumptions used in ICIM are (1) the genotypic value of an individual is the summation of effects from all genes affecting the trait of interest; and (2) linked QTL are separated by at least one blank marker interval. Under the two assumptions, they proved that additive effect of the QTL located in a marker interval can be completely absorbed by the regression coefficients of the two flanking markers, while the QTL dominance effect causes marker dominance effects, as well as additive by additive and dominance by dominance interactions between the two flanking markers. By including two multiplication variables between flanking markers, the additive and dominance effects of one QTL can be completely absorbed. As a consequence, an inclusive linear model of phenotype regressing on all genetic markers (and marker multiplications) can be used to fit the positions and additive (and dominance) effects of all QTL in the genome. A two-step strategy was adopted in ICIM for additive and dominance QTL mapping. In the first step, stepwise regression was applied to identify the most significant marker variables in the linear model. In the second step, one-dimensional scanning or interval mapping was conducted for detecting QTL and estimating its additive and dominance effects, based on the phenotypic values adjusted by the regression model in the first step.

== Digenic epistasis mapping ==
Under the same assumptions in additive and dominance QTL mapping of ICIM, an additive by additive epistatic effect between two interacting QTL can be completely absorbed by the four marker interaction variables between the two pairs of flanking markers [5]. The coefficients of four marker interactions of two pairs of flanking markers contain the genetic information of the additive by additive epistasis between the two marker intervals. As a consequence, a linear model of phenotype regressing on both markers and marker multiplications can fit the positions and effects of all QTL and their digenic interactions. Similar to the additive QTL mapping of ICIM, the two-step strategy was also adopted in additive by additive epistasis mapping. In the first step, stepwise regression was applied to identify the most significant marker and marker interactions. In the second step, two-dimensional scanning was conducted for detecting additive by additive QTL and estimating the genetic effects, based on the phenotypic values adjusted by the regression model in the first step.

== Applications in real mapping populations ==
In a barley doubled haploid population nine additive QTL affecting kernel weight were identified to be distributed on five out of the seven chromosomes, explaining 81% of the phenotypic variance. In this population additive effects have explained most of the phenotypic variance, approximating the estimated heritability in the broad sense, which indicates that most of the genetic variance was caused by additive QTL.

Besides that, ICIM has been successfully used in wild and cultivated soybeans in mapping conserved salt tolerance QTL, in rice mapping tiller angle QTL, and grain length QTL, in wheat mapping flour and noodle color components and yellow pigment content, and adult-plant resistance to stripe rust QTL. Some of these detected QTL have been fine mapped.

== Joint QTL mapping in multiple families or populations ==
Bi-parental populations are mostly used in QTL linkage mapping. QTL not segregating between the two parents cannot be detected. To find most, if not all, genes controlling a trait of interest, multiple parents have to be used. Complex cross populations have been proposed in recent years for this purpose. These crosses allow a more powerful understanding of the genetic basis of quantitative traits in more relevant genetic backgrounds. They extended ICIM to map Maize Nested Association Mapping (NAM). design recently proposed by the group of Edward Buckler at Cornell University. QTL detection efficiency of ICIM in this design was investigated through extensive simulations. In the actual maize NAM population, ICIM detected a total of 52 additive QTL affecting the silk flowering time in maize. These QTL have explained 79% of the phenotypic variance in this population.

== Software for QTL mapping ==
There is software that implements ICIM additive and epistasis mapping. Its function is: (1) implementation of mapping methods including single marker analysis, interval mapping, ICIM for additive and dominance, ICIM for digenic epistasis, selective phenotyping, etc.; (2) QTL linkage analysis more than twenty mapping populations derived from bi-parental cross, including backcross, double haploid, recombinant inbred lines, etc.; (3) Power analysis for simulated populations under the genetic models user defined; and (4) QTL mapping for non-idealized chromosome segment substitution lines.
