= Nested association mapping =

Maize laboratory technique

Nested association mapping (NAM) is a technique designed by the labs of Edward Buckler, James Holland, and Michael McMullen for identifying and dissecting the genetic architecture of complex traits in corn (Zea mays). Nested association mapping (unlike association mapping) is a specific technique that cannot be performed outside of a specifically designed population such as the Maize NAM population, the details of which are described below.

== Theory ==
NAM was created as a means of combining the advantages and eliminating the disadvantages of two traditional methods for identifying quantitative trait loci: linkage analysis and association mapping. Linkage analysis depends upon recent genetic recombination between two different plant lines (as the result of a genetic cross) to identify general regions of interest, with the advantage of requiring few genetic markers to ensure genome wide coverage and high statistical power per allele. Linkage analysis, however, has the disadvantages of low mapping resolution and low allele richness. Association mapping, by contrast, takes advantage of historic recombination, and is performed by scanning a genome for SNPs in linkage disequilibrium with a trait of interest. Association mapping has advantages over linkage analysis in that it can map with high resolution and has high allelic richness, however, it also requires extensive knowledge of SNPs within the genome and is thus only now becoming possible in diverse species such as maize.

NAM takes advantage of both historic and recent recombination events in order to have the advantages of low marker density requirements, high allele richness, high mapping resolution, and high statistical power, with none of the disadvantages of either linkage analysis or association mapping. In these regards, the NAM approach is similar in principle to the MAGIC lines and AMPRILs in Arabidopsis and the Collaborative Cross in mouse.

== Creation of the maize NAM population ==
Twenty-five diverse corn lines were chosen as the parental lines for the NAM population in order to encompass the remarkable diversity of maize and preserve historic linkage disequilibrium. Each parental line was crossed to the B73 maize inbred (chosen as a reference line due to its use in the public maize sequencing project and wide deployment as one of the most successful commercial inbred lines) to create the F1 population. The F1 plants were then self-fertilized for six generations in order to create a total of 200 homozygous recombinant inbred lines (RILs) per family, for a total of 5000 RILs within the NAM population. The lines are publicly available through the USDA-ARS Maize Stock Center.

Each RIL was then genotyped with the same 1106 molecular markers (for this to be possible, the researchers selected markers for which B73 had a rare allele), in order to identify recombination blocks. After genotyping with the 1106 markers, each of the parental lines was either sequenced or high-density genotyped, and the results of that sequencing/genotyping overlaid on the recombination blocks identified for each RIL. The result was 5000 RILs that were either fully sequenced or high density genotyped that, due to genotyping with the common 1106 markers, could all be compared to each other and analyzed together (Figure 1).

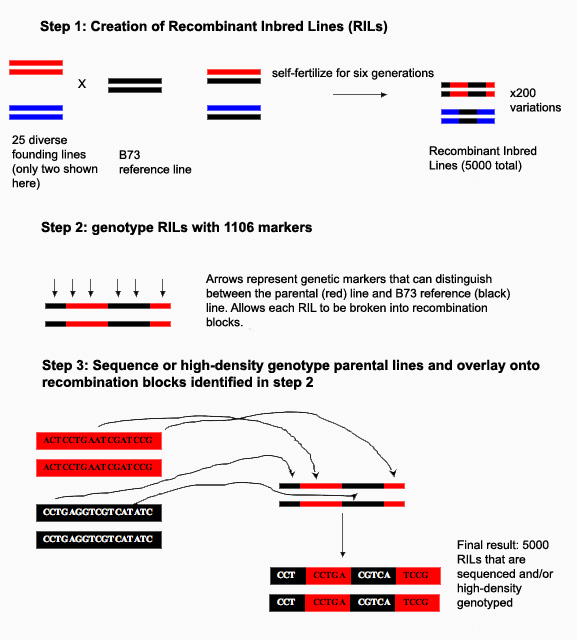
Figure 1. Creation of the NAM population.

The second aspect of the NAM population characterization is the sequencing of the parental lines. This captures information on the natural variation that went into the population and a record of the extensive recombination captured in the history of maize variation. The first phase of this sequencing was by reduced representation sequencing using next generation sequencing technology, as report in Gore, Chia et al. in 2009. This initial sequencing discovered 1.6 million variable regions in maize, which is now facilitating analysis of a wide range of traits.

== Process ==
As with traditional QTL mapping strategies, the general goal in Nested Association Mapping is to correlate a phenotype of interest with specific genotypes. One of the creators' stated goals for the NAM population was to be able to perform genome-wide association studies in maize by looking for associations between SNPs within the NAM population and quantitative traits of interest (e.g. flowering time, plant height, carotene content). As of 2009, however, the sequencing of the original parental lines was not yet completed to the degree necessary to perform these analyses. The NAM population has, however, been successfully used for linkage analysis. In the linkage study that has been released, the unique structure of the NAM population, described in the previous section, allowed for joint stepwise regression and joint inclusive composite interval mapping of the combined NAM families to identify QTLs for flowering time.

== Current use ==
The first publication in which NAM was used to identify QTLs was authored by the Buckler lab on the genetic architecture of maize flowering time, and published in the summer of 2009. In this groundbreaking study, the authors scored days to silking, days to anthesis, and the silking-anthesis interval for nearly one million plants, then performed single and joint stepwise regression and inclusive composite interval mapping (ICIM) to identify 39 QTLs explaining 89% of the variance in days to silking and days to anthesis and 29 QTLs explaining 64% of the variance in the silking-anthesis interval.

Ninety-eight percent of the flowering time QTLs identified in this paper were found to affect flowering time by less than one day (as compared to the B73 reference). These relatively small QTL effects, however, were also shown to sum for each family to equal large differences and changes in days to silking. Furthermore, it was observed that while most QTLs were shared between families, each family appears to have functionally distinct alleles for most QTLs. These observations led the authors to propose a model of "Common genes with uncommon variants" to explain flowering time diversity in maize. They tested their model by documenting an allelic series in the previously studied maize flowering time QTL Vgt1 (vegetation-to-transition1) by controlling for genetic background and estimating the effects of vgt1 in each family. They then went on to identify specific sequence variants that corresponded to the allelic series, including one allele containing a miniature transposon strongly associated with early flowering, and other alleles containing SNPs associated with later flowering.

Maize NAMs have helped to map otherwise difficult traits conveying resistance to fungi including Kump et al 2011, for southern leaf blight resistance, and Poland et al 2011, for northern leaf blight resistance.

== Implications ==
Nested association mapping has tremendous potential for the investigation of agronomic traits in maize and other species. As the initial flowering time study demonstrates, NAM has the power to identify QTLs for agriculturally relevant traits and to relate those QTLs to homologs and candidate genes in non-maize species. Furthermore, the NAM lines become a powerful public resource for the maize community, and an opportunity for the sharing of maize germplasm as well as the results of maize studies via common databases (see external links), further facilitating future research into maize agricultural traits. Given that maize is one of the most important agricultural crops worldwide, such research has powerful implications for the genetic improvement of crops, and subsequently, worldwide food security.

Similar designs are also being created for wheat, barley, sorghum, and Arabidopsis thaliana.

== See also ==
- Family based QTL mapping
- Marker assisted selection
- Molecular breeding
- QTL mapping
