= TDT =

TDT may refer to:

- Digital terrestrial television
  - TDT (TV station), a digital television station in Tasmania, Australia
  - TDT (Portugal), digital terrestrial television in Portugal
  - TDT (Spain), digital terrestrial television in Spain
- TDT Band (The Down Troddence), a six piece Indian thrash metal band
- TDT Banda or Thamar Dillon Thomas Banda (fl. 1957–1962), Nyasaland politician
- Terminal deoxynucleotidyl transferase, a specialized DNA polymerase expressed in immune cells
- Terrestrial Dynamical Time, an obsolete name for Terrestrial Time
- The Damned Things, an American heavy metal supergroup
- Time domain transmissometry, a method of testing transmission lines
- Toronto Dance Theatre, a Canadian modern dance company based in Toronto, Ontario
- Tracing Debugging Technique, an early debugger by DEC
- Transmission disequilibrium test, a family-based genetic association test
- The Dark Tower (series), a book series written by Stephen King.
