= Splicing quantitative trait loci =

Genetic loci that regulate pre-mRNA splicing

Splicing quantitative trait loci (abbreviated sQTLs or splicing QTLs) are quantitative trait loci that regulate alternative splicing of pre-mRNA. They can be detected using RNA-seq data. Methods that have been developed to discover sQTLs include LeafCutter, Altrans, Cufflinks, and MISO.
