= Gene pyramiding =

Gene pyramiding is the simultaneous selection for and/or introduction of multiple genes during plant breeding. Objectives of gene pyramiding includes 1) enhancing trait performance by combining two or more complementary genes, 2) remedying deficits by introgressing genes from other sources, 3) increasing the durability. For example, pyramiding has been successfully demonstrated in Oryza sativa for rice blast, producing durable multi-race resistance simultaneously. Pyramiding and Marker Assisted Selection can be combined as Marker-Assisted Pyramiding. Gene stacking can be achieved a few different ways, and pyramiding is one of those methods.
