= Haplotype-relative-risk =

The haplotype-relative-risk (HRR) method is a family-based method for determining gene allele association to a disease in the presence of actual genetic linkage. Nuclear families with one affected child are sampled using the parental haplotypes not transmitted as a control. While similar to the genotype relative risk (RR), the HRR provides a solution to the problem of population stratification by only sampling within family trios. The HRR method was first proposed by Rubinstein in 1981 then detailed in 1987 by Rubinstein and Falk and is an important tool in genetic association studies.

The original method proposed by Falk and Rubinstien fell under scrutiny in 1989, when Ott showed the equivalence of HRR to the classical RR method demonstrating that the HRR holds only when there is zero chance of recombination between a disease locus and its markers. Yet, even when the recombination factor for a locus and its genetic markers is >0 HRR estimates are still more conservative than RR estimates.

While the HRR method has proven an effective means of avoiding population stratification biases, another family-based association test known as the transmission disequilibrium test, or TDT, is more commonly used. Some research uses both HRR and TDT for their ability to complement each other since one result may give no association while the other will. A positive association result from both TDT and HRR means there is strong evidence that a link exists and vice versa. For example, both HRR and TDT methods were used in a study looking for polymorphism in D2 and D3 dopamine receptor in association with schizophrenia and neither found any evidence for linkage, making an actual role of those genes in the etiology of the mental disorder all the more unlikely.

== Calculation ==
This model represents a case which there is a single locus where all genotypes may lead to expression of the allele in its most simplified definition. Under these parameters a linkage disequilibrium of more than 50% means there is a possible link to the gene allele and inheritance.

$HRR = \frac{P_1}{1-P_1} * \frac{1-P_2}{P_2}$

Gives the HHR which can be estimated by

$HRR = \frac{a^'}{b^'} * \frac{d^'}{c^'}$

a^{'} denotes the observed frequency of children who are positive for the gene allele H.

b^{'} denotes the observed frequency of children who are negative for the gene allele H.

c^{'} is the observed frequency of families with at least one transmitted parental marker allele H.

d^{'} is the observed frequency of families with no transmitted parental marker allele H.

P_{1} is the probability this child is positive for the allele of interest H.

P_{2} is the probability that at least one of the nontransmitted parental marker alleles equals the allele of interest H.

H is the allele of interest.
