= Gene stacking =

Gene stacking is the combination of more than one gene for plant disease resistance, or crop productivity, or other horticultural traits. (Note: p. 199, "Independent of modern biotechnology, “stacking” traditionally refers to the natural addition of different plant properties by genetic crossing. Modern biotechnology has broadened the options for stacking to include more taxonomically diverse sources, a wider selection of genes and regulatory elements, and consequently of traits.") In plant breeding traditionally that means breeding those genes in, but increasingly also can mean genetic engineering. This can be achieved a few different ways, and gene pyramiding is one of those methods. (Note: p. 197, "The term gene pyramiding is used in agricultural research to describe a breeding approach to achieve pest control and higher crop yield. It is essentially a way of identifying and introducing multiple genes, which each impart resistance to an independent insect/microbial pest/weed etc., or impart resistance to a single pest through independent host pathways.") Stacking of transgenes is yet more difficult than stacking natural genes, but especially in the case of pest resistance genes which require a significant financial investment to insert, is advantageous over other methods. Pathosystems with rapid evolution in the pathogen have long been considered good targets of stacking, to broaden and prolong resistance.

Assaying for successful insertion of R genes is much more difficult than for one at a time. A simple challenge assay will only tell between complete failure/some unknown degree of success. Building a new technique specifically for the multiple genes you are attempting to insert may be necessary.
