= Edward Buckler =

Plant geneticist

Edward S. Buckler
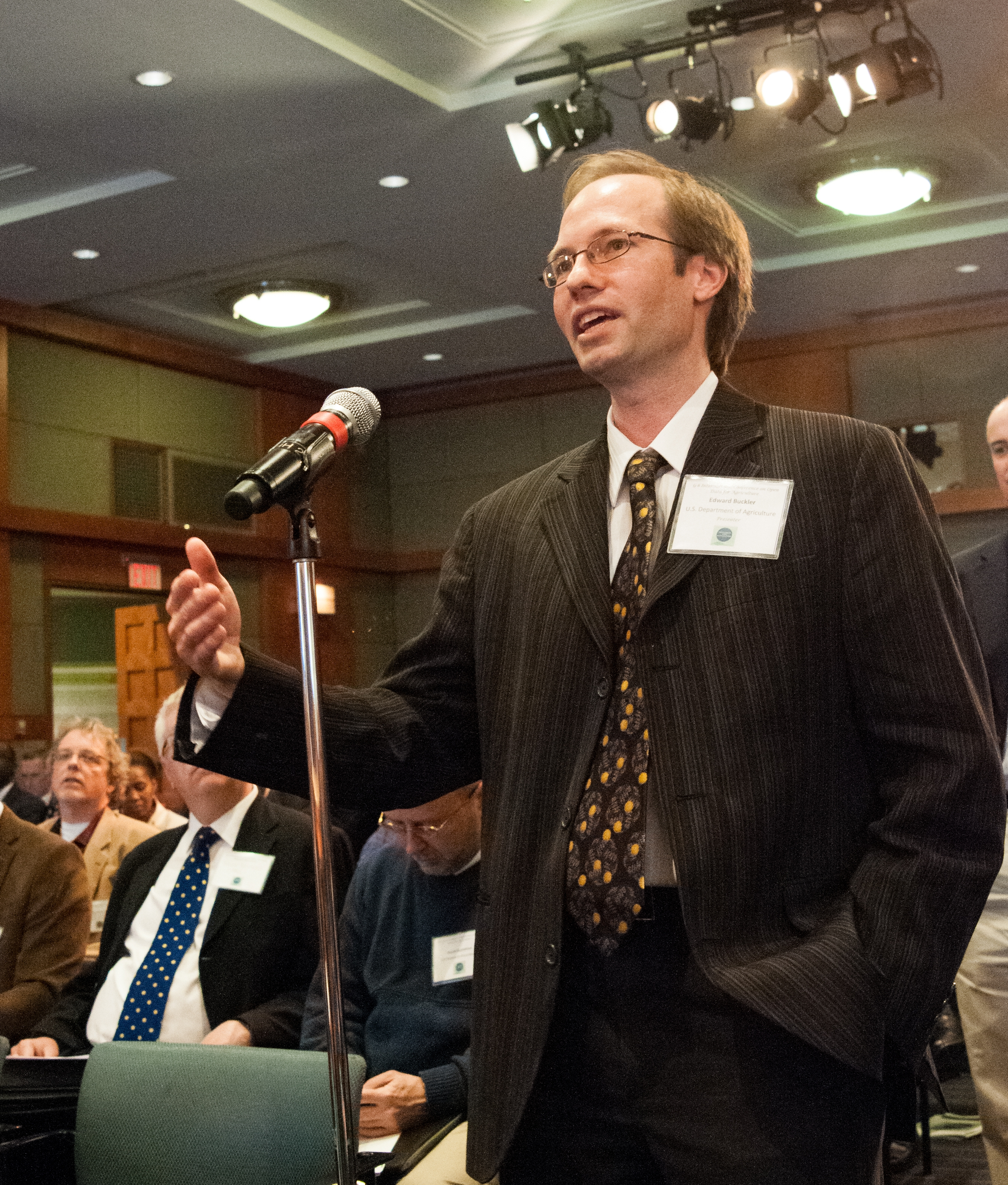
- Edward S. Buckler
- Born: Arlington, Virginia
- Education: University of Missouri
- Awards: NAS Prize in Food and Agricultural Sciences
- Scientific career
- Fields: Genetics
- Workplaces: USDA, Cornell University
- Doctoral advisor: Timothy Holtsford

Edward S. Buckler is a plant geneticist with the USDA Agricultural Research Service and holds an adjunct appointment at Cornell University. His work focuses on both quantitative and statistical genetics in maize as well as other crops such as cassava. He originated the concept of Nested association mapping and created the first population designed for this type of quantitative genetic analysis. Buckler was elected an American Association for the Advancement of Science Fellow in 2012. In 2014, he was elected to the National Academy of Sciences. In 2017, he received the NAS prize in Food and Agricultural Science for his work using natural genetic diversity to develop varieties of maize with fifteen times more vitamin A than existing varieties.

== Career ==
Buckler spent his childhood in Arlington, Virginia, where his mother worked as a microbiologist and his father worked for the US Navy. He is dyslexic and did not read until the second grade. He attended the University of Virginia, where he majored in both biology and archaeology. After graduation he moved to the University of Missouri, where he studied maize domestication and molecular evolution under Timothy Holtsford, met his wife, and graduated with his PhD in 1997. He postdoc'ed at North Carolina State University with Bruce Weir and Michael Purugganan. He joined the USDA as a geneticist in 1998 and since 2003 has been stationed in Ithaca, NY, and associated with Cornell University. In 2014 Buckler hosted Bill Gates during a visit to Cornell associated with Gates' support for developing improved cassava varieties.

== Nested Association Mapping ==
Nested Association Mapping (NAM) was devised as an approach to combine the advantages of linkage mapping with structured populations and association mapping with natural populations while limiting their respective drawback. Buckler began developing the initial maize Nested Association Mapping population in 2002, using twenty five maize inbreds selected to capture as many of the alleles present in the species as possible and crossing each to a common parent to generate 5,000 inbred lines (200 per family), ultimately capturing more than 100,000 genetic crossovers. Buckler's lab released the inbreds as well as the first study using them to map loci controlling a phenotype (flowering time) in 2009. The population has since been used to identify the genetic architecture controlling more than 100 whole plant traits as well as tens of thousands of molecular traits (metabolites and gene transcript abundance). After the release and success of the maize NAM population, similar populations were developed for quantitative genetic studies in rice, soybean, wheat, sorghum, barley, and canola.

== Genotyping by sequencing ==
In 2011 Buckler's group released a simple protocol for using the then-new technology of high throughput sequencing to genotype thousands of genetic markers across hundreds of individuals. This Genotyping by Sequencing approach was widely adopted, with the initial protocol paper cited more than 4,000 times .

== Tools for breeding ==
Buckler's research group also developed TASSEL, a set of software tools for discovering and imputing SNPs as well as conducting genome wide association analyses using generalized linear models and mixed linear models. The tool was developed with the goal of being able to run within the memory and CPU constraints of an average laptop, enabling use by scientists and plant breeders around the world and in developing countries. The paper describing this software package has been citied more than 3,400 times.
