= Healy River Airport =

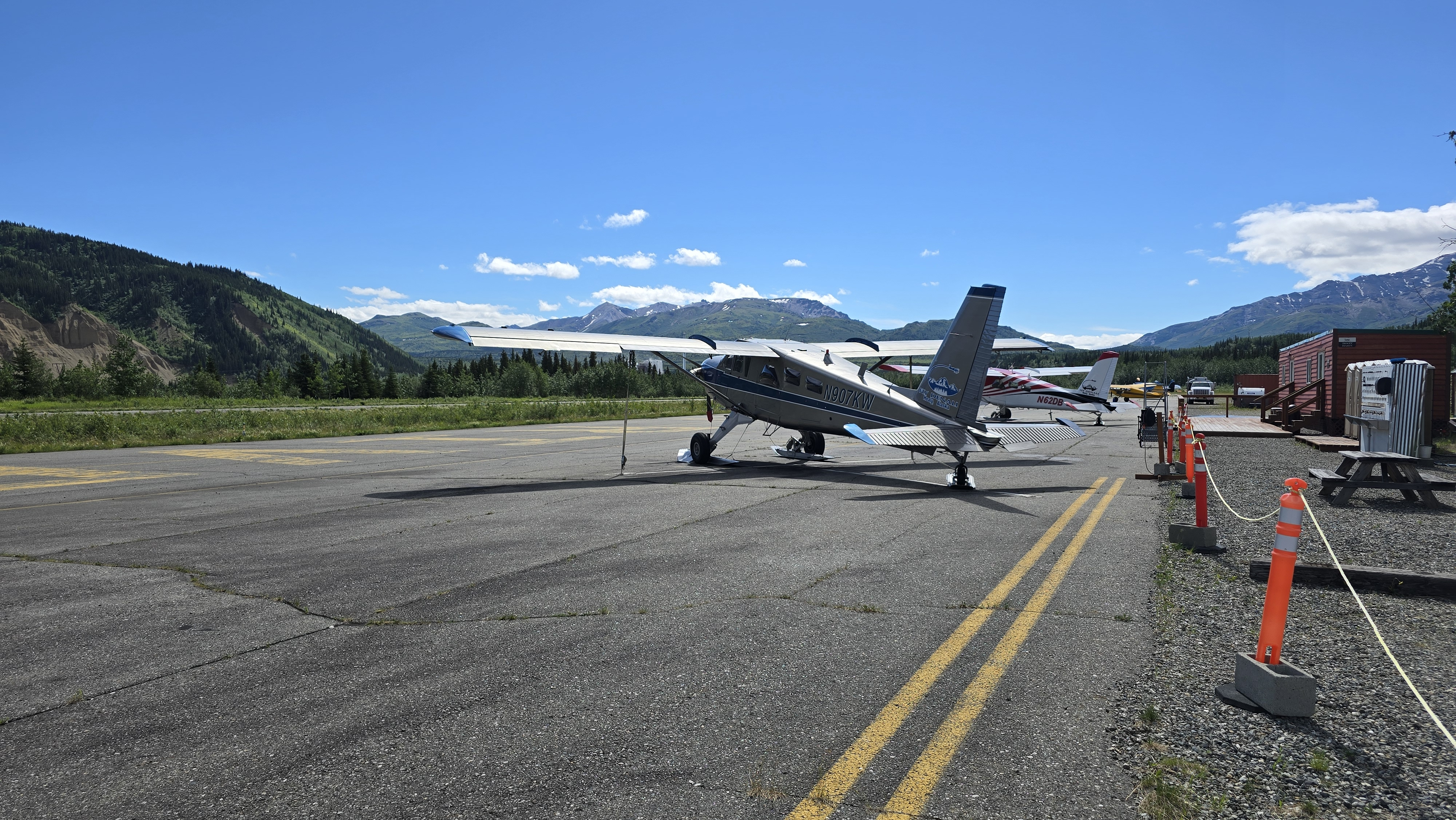
- IATA: none; ICAO: PAHV; FAA LID: HRR

Summary
- Airport type: Public
- Owner: State of Alaska
- Serves: Healy, Alaska
- Elevation AMSL: 1,263 ft (385 m)
- Coordinates: 63°52′03″N 148°58′08″W

Map
- Location of airport in Alaska

Runways
| Direction | Length | | Surface |
| Direction | ft | m | Surface |
|---|---|---|---|
| 15/33 | 2,912 | 888 | Asphalt |

Statistics (2005)
- Aircraft operations: 1,300
- Based aircraft: 7
- Source: Federal Aviation Administration

Healy River Airport (ICAO: PAHV, FAA LID: HRR) is a state owned, public use airport serving Healy, a community located in the Denali Borough of the U.S. state of Alaska. It is included in the National Plan of Integrated Airport Systems for 2011–2015, which categorized it as a general aviation facility.

== Facilities and aircraft ==
Healy River Airport covers an area of 1,294 acres (524 ha) at an elevation of 1,263 feet (385 m) above mean sea level. It has one runway designated 15/33 with an asphalt surface measuring 2,912 by 60 feet (888 x 18 m).

For the 12-month period ending December 31, 2005, the airport had 1,300 aircraft operations, an average of 108 per month: 61.5% general aviation and 38.5% air taxi. At that time there were 7 aircraft based at this airport: 85% single-engine and 14% multi-engine.

== See also ==
- Healy Lake Airport in Healy Lake, Alaska (Southeast Fairbanks Census Area) at coordinates 63°59′45″N 144°41′33″W
- List of airports in Alaska
