= Identity by type =

Characteristic of some genetic alleles

Alleles have identity by type (IBT) when they have the same phenotypic effect or, if applied to a variation in the composition of DNA such as a single nucleotide polymorphism, when they have the same DNA sequence.

Alleles that are identical by type fall into two groups; those that are identical by descent (IBD) because they arose from the same allele in an earlier generation; and those that are non-identical by descent (NIBD) because they arose from separate mutations. NIBD can also be identical by state (IBS) though, if they share the same mutational expression but not through a recent common ancestor. Parent-offspring pairs share 50% of their genes IBD, and monozygotic twins share 100% IBD.

== See also ==
- Population genetics
