= CiteAb =

British science data company and search engine

CiteAb Limited
- Type: Private company
- Industry: Biotech, Life sciences
- Founded: 2014
- Headquarters: Bath, England
- Key people: Andrew Chalmers, CSO. David Kelly, CEO. Adam Pope, CTO.
- Products: Search engine for Research antibodies
- Number of employees: 11 (2021)
- Website: citeab.com

CiteAb Limited is a life science data company located in Bath, England that offers an antibody, biochemicals, experimental models, kits and protein search tool to aid biomedical scientists in their research.

== History and operations ==
CiteAb started in 2013 as an academic project by Dr Andrew Chalmers, a senior lecturer at the University of Bath. The resource was established to help scientific researchers find suitable antibodies for their experiments - such antibodies can be helpful in context of screenings, therapeutic development, and drug discovery.

CiteAb ranks antibodies by citations, making it possible for researchers to find reagents that have been successfully used in past research papers. The accompanying citations are listed, so the data contained within the publications can also be checked. The CiteAb platform was built in collaboration with technology company Storm Consultancy, in Bath, in 2012. A trial website was soft-launched in September 2012 before the full website was publicly launched in September 2013. In June 2013, the number of antibodies listed by CiteAb reached the one million mark. In July 2014 the company announced it had 2 million antibodies in its database. In 2018 CiteAb added a biochemical search to its platform.

The company spun out from the University of Bath in January 2014, and CiteAb Limited was formed.

== Awards and Funding ==
Initial funding was provided as part of an Engineering and Physical Sciences Research Council (EPSRC) ‘Knowledge Transfer Account' and the Higher Education Funding Council for England’s ‘Innovation Fund’ – with funds administered by the University of Bath’s Research Development and Support Office – to enable the growth and development of CiteAb prior to its spin-out.

CiteAb was winner of the Best Startup at the 2013 Bath Digital Festival. It was awarded funding from the West of England Growth Fund, administered by the West of England Local Enterprise Partnership.

In August 2014, CiteAb was shortlisted for the Bath Business Awards in the category 'Innovative Startup Business of the Year'. On 11 September 2014 the company was named as the winner of the Bath Business Awards 'Innovative Startup Company' category.

In March 2018 CiteAb won the 'Export' category in the Medilink South West awards - at that point the company's products and services are used by between 50k and 100k individuals per month from 196 countries and 1,400 institutions.
