= Proximity extension assay =

Protein detection method

The proximity extension assay (PEA) is a method for detecting and quantifying the amount of many specific proteins present in a biological sample such as serum or plasma. The method is used in the research field of proteomics, specifically affinity proteomics, where in one searches for differences in the abundance of many specific proteins in blood for use as a biomarker. Biomarkers and biomarker signature combinations, are useful for determining disease states and drug efficacy. Most methods for detecting proteins involve the use of a solid phase for first capturing and immobilizing the protein analyte, where in one or a few proteins are quantified, such as ELISA. In contrast, PEA is performed without a solid phase in a homogeneous one tube reaction solution where in sets of antibodies coupled to unique DNA sequence tags, so called proximity probes, work in pairs specific for each target protein. PEA is often performed using antibodies and is a type of immunoassay. Target binding by the proximity probes increases their local relative effective concentration of the DNA-tags enabling hybridization of weak complementarity to each other which then enables a DNA polymerase mediated extension forming a united DNA sequence specific for each target protein detected. The use of 3'exonuclease proficient polymerases lowers background noise and hyper thermostable polymerases mediate a simple assay with a natural hot-start reaction. This created pool of extension products of DNA sequence forms amplicons amplified by PCR where each amplicon sequence corresponds to a target proteins identity and the amount reflects its quantity. Subsequently, these amplicons are detected and quantified by either real-time PCR or next generation DNA sequencing by DNA-tag counting. PEA enables the detection of many proteins simultaneously (so called multiplexing) due to the readout requiring the combination of two correctly bound antibodies per protein to generate a detectable DNA sequence from the extension reaction. Only cognate pairs of sequence are detected as true signal, enabling multiplexing beyond solid phase capture methods limited at around 30 proteins at a time. The DNA amplification power also enable minute sample volumes even below one microliter. PEA has been used in over 1000 research publications.

== Development ==
PEA is derived from the proximity ligation assay (PLA) which uses a DNA ligase enzyme to unite the sequences of the proximity probes instead of a DNA polymerase. PLA is also suitable for multiplexing, but suffers from enzymatic sample variable inhibition of ligase enzymes from components of serum and plasma samples. DNA polymerase enzymes do not suffer the same inhibition and is also readily multiplexable and has been multiplexed up to 384 proteins. PEA performance is temperature sensitive as it is a DNA hybridization-based reaction. So the use of hyper-thermostable polymerases with no activity at room temperature supports bench top reaction assembly.
