= Transmission disequilibrium test =

Test for genetic linkage between a marker and trait

In genetics, the transmission disequilibrium test (TDT) was proposed by Spielman, McGinnis and Ewens (1993) as a family-based association test for the presence of genetic linkage between a genetic marker and a trait. It is an application of McNemar's test.

A specificity of the TDT is that it will detect genetic linkage only in the presence of genetic association. While genetic association can be caused by population structure, genetic linkage will not be affected, which makes the TDT robust to the presence of population structure.

== The case of trios: one affected child per family ==
=== Description of the test ===
We first describe the TDT in the case where families consist of trios (two parents and one affected child). Our description follows the notations used in Spielman, McGinnis & Ewens (1993).

The TDT measures the over-transmission of an allele from heterozygous parents to affected offsprings. The n affected offsprings have 2n parents. These can be represented by the transmitted and the non-transmitted alleles M_{1} and M_{2} at some analogical locus. Summarizing the data in a 2 by 2 table gives:

	Non-transmitted allele		
Transmitted allele	M_{1}	M_{2}	Total
M_{1}	a	b	a + b
M_{2}	c	d	c + d
Total	a + c	b + d	2n

The derivation of the TDT shows that one should only use the heterozygous parents (total number b + c). The TDT tests whether the proportions b/(b + c) and c/(b + c) are compatible with probabilities (0.5, 0.5). This hypothesis can be tested using a binomial (asymptotically chi-square) test with one degree of freedom:

$$\chi^2 = \frac{ [b - (b+c)/2]^2}{(b+c)/2} + \frac{ [c - (b+c)/2]^2}{(b+c)/2} = \frac{(b-c)^2}{b+c}$$

=== Outline of the test derivation ===
A derivation of the test consists of using a population genetics model to obtain the expected proportions for the quantities a, b, c, d in the table above. In particular, one can show that under nearly all disease models the expected proportion of b and c are identical. This result motivates the use of a binomial (asymptotically χ^{2}) test to test whether these proportions are equal.

On the other hand, one can also show that under such models the proportions a, b, c, d are not equal to the product of the marginals probabilities $\tfrac{a+b}{2n}, \tfrac{c+d}{2n}$ and $\tfrac{a+c}{2n}, \tfrac{b+d}{2n}.$ A rewording of this statement would be that the type of the transmitted allele is not, in general, independent of the type of the non-transmitted allele. A consequence is that a χ^{2} test for homogeneity/independence does not test the appropriate hypothesis, and thus, only heterozygous parents are included.

== Extension to two affected child per family ==
=== Extension of the test ===
The TDT can be readily extended beyond the case of trios. We keep following the notations of Spielman, McGinnis & Ewens (1993). Consider a total of h heterozygous parents. We use the fact that the transmission to different children are independent. The information can be then summarized in three categories:

- i = number of parents who transmit M_{1} to both children.
- h − i − j = number of parents who transmit M_{1} to one child and M_{2} to another.
- j = number of parents who transmit M_{2} to both children.

Using the notations of the previous paragraph we have:

$$\begin{align}
b &= 2i + (h-i-j) = h + i - j \\
c &= 2j + (h-i-j) = h - i + j
\end{align}$$

leading to the chi-squared test statistic:

$$\chi_{tdt}^2 = \frac{4(i-j)^2}{h}.$$

=== Relation with another linkage statistic ===
The comparison with the more traditional (at least at the time when the TDT was proposed) linkage test proposed by Blackwelder and Elston 1985 is informative. The Blackwelder and Elston approach uses the total number of haplotypes identical by descent (mean haplotype sharing). This measure ignores the allelic state of a marker and simply compares the number of times a parent transmits the same allele to both affected children with the number of times a different allele is transmitted. The test statistic is:

$$\chi^2_{hs} = \frac{(2i+2j-h)^2}{h}.$$

Under the null hypothesis of no linkage the expected proportions of (i, h − i − j, j) are (0.25, 0.5, 0.25). One can derive a simple chi-square statistic with 2 degrees of freedom:

$$\chi^2_{total} = \frac{(i - h/4)^2}{h/4} + \frac{(h-i-j-h/2)^2}{h/2} + \frac{(j-h/4)^2}{h/4} = \chi^2_{tdt} + \chi^2_{hs}.$$

It clearly appears that the total statistic (with two degree of freedom) is the sum of two independent components: one is the traditional linkage measure and the other is the TDT statistic.

== Modified version ==
More recently, Wittkowski KM, Liu X. (2002/2004) proposed a modification to the TDT that can be more powerful under some alternatives, although the asymptotic properties under the null hypothesis are equivalent.

The motivating idea for this modification is the fact that, while the transmissions of both allele from parents to a child are independent, the effects of other filial genetic or environmental covariates on penetrance are the same for both alleles transmitted to the same child. This situation can be important if, for example, the genetic marker is linked to a disease locus with a strong selection against heterozygous individuals. This observation suggests to shift the statistical model from a set of independent transmissions to a set of independent children (see Sasieni (1997) for the corresponding problem in case-control association tests). While this observation does not affect the distribution under the null hypothesis of no linkage, it allows, for some disease models, to design a more powerful test.

In this modified TDT test the children are stratified by parental type and the modified test statistic becomes:

$$\chi^2 = \frac{ \bigl( [n_{\rm PQ} - n_{\rm QQ}]_{\rm PQ \sim QQ} + 2\times[n_{\rm PP} - n_{\rm QQ}]_{\rm PQ \sim PQ} + [n_{\rm PP} - n_{\rm PQ}]_{\rm PP \sim PQ} \bigr)^2}{[n_{\rm PQ} + n_{\rm QQ}]_{\rm PQ \sim QQ} + 4\times[n_{\rm PP} + n_{\rm QQ}]_{\rm PQ \sim PQ} + [n_{\rm PQ} + n_{\rm PP}]_{\rm PP \sim PQ}}$$

where $[n_{\rm PQ}]_{\rm PQ \sim QQ}$ is the number of PQ children from parents with the PQ and QQ types.
