= Rare variant (genetics) =

A rare variant is a genetic variant which occurs at low frequency in a population. Rare variants play a significant role in both complex and Mendelian disease and are responsible for a portion of the missing heritability of complex diseases. The theoretical case for a significant role of rare variants is that alleles that strongly predispose an individual to disease will be kept at low frequencies in populations by purifying selection. Rare variants are increasingly being studied, as a consequence of whole exome and whole genome sequencing efforts. While these variants are individually infrequent in populations, there are many in human populations, and they can be unique to specific populations. They are more likely to be deleterious than common variants, as a result of rapid population growth and weak purifying selection. They have been suspected of acting independently or along with common variants to cause disease states.

== Methods of discovery ==
Some methods, such as genetic burden tests, have been specifically developed to study genetic association of rare variants. These methods aggregate rare variants over genetic regions, such as genes or whole pathways, and evaluate cumulative effects of multiple genetic variants. These methods may increase power when multiple variants in the region are associated with a disease or a trait. In addition, compared to a genome-wide association study, a region or gene based test performs much fewer tests resulting in a less stringent multiple-hypothesis correction than the genome-wide significance. Some examples of these methods are SKAT, SKAT-O, ARIEL test, aSUM and STAAR. SNP annotations help to prioritize rare functional variants, and incorporating these annotations can effectively boost the power of genetic association of rare variants analysis of whole exome and whole genome sequencing studies.

== See also ==
- Allele frequency
- Functional genomics
- Genetic drift
- SNP annotation
- Whole exome sequencing
- Whole genome sequencing
