= Genomic annotation =

Genomic annotation can refer to:

- DNA annotation
- SNP annotation

== See also ==
- Vertebrate Genome Annotation Project
