= Whole genome sequencing =

Sequencing all the DNA of an individual at once

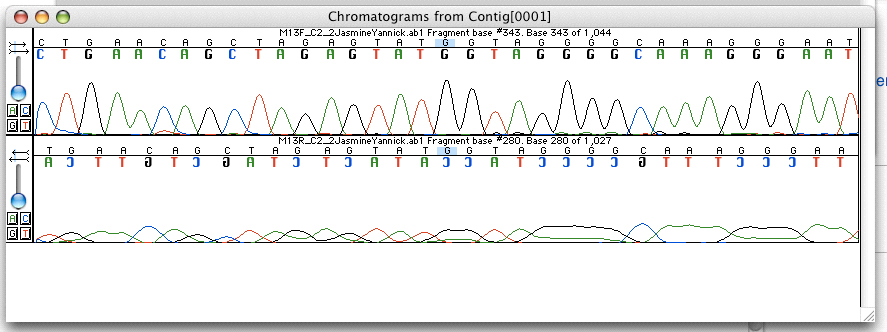
Electropherograms are commonly used to sequence portions of genomes.

DNA (deoxyribonucleic acid) is the cell's genetic material, contained in chromosomes within the cell nucleus and mitochondria. Except for certain cells (for example, sperm and egg cells), the cell nucleus contains 23 pairs of chromosomes. A chromosome contains many genes. A gene is a segment of DNA that provides the code to construct a protein or RNA molecule. The DNA molecule is a long, coiled double helix that resembles a spiral staircase. In it, 2 strands, composed of sugar (deoxyribose) and phosphate molecules, are connected by pairs of 4 molecules called bases, which form the steps of the staircase. In the steps, adenine is paired with thymine and guanine is paired with cytosine. Each pair of bases is held together by a hydrogen bond. A gene consists of a sequence of bases. Sequences of 3 bases code for an amino acid (amino acids are molecules that are the building blocks of proteins) or other information.

Whole genome sequencing (WGS), also known as full genome sequencing or just genome sequencing, is the process of determining the entirety of the DNA sequence of an organism's genome at a single time. This entails sequencing all of an organism's chromosomal DNA as well as DNA contained in the mitochondria and, for plants, in the chloroplast.

Whole genome sequencing has largely been used as a research tool, but was being introduced to clinics in 2014. In the future of personalized medicine, whole genome sequence data may be an important tool to guide therapeutic intervention. The tool of gene sequencing at SNP level is also used to pinpoint functional variants from association studies and improve the knowledge available to researchers interested in evolutionary biology, and hence may lay the foundation for predicting disease susceptibility and drug response.

Whole genome sequencing should not be confused with DNA profiling, which only determines the likelihood that genetic material came from a particular individual or group, and does not contain additional information on genetic relationships, origin or susceptibility to specific diseases. In addition, whole genome sequencing should not be confused with methods that sequence specific subsets of the genome – such methods include whole exome sequencing (1–2% of the genome) or SNP genotyping (< 0.1% of the genome).

== History ==
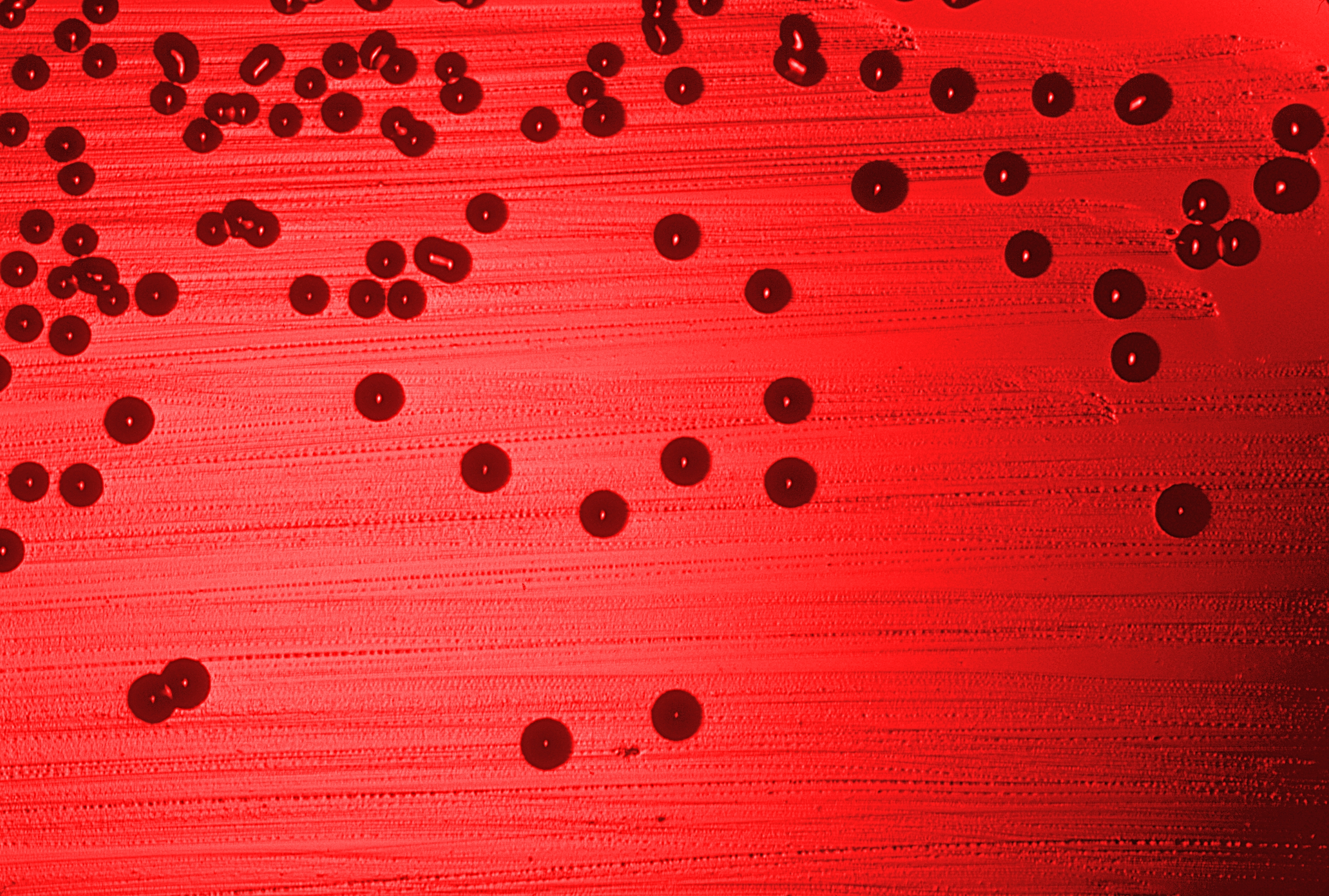
The first bacterial whole genome to be sequenced was of the bacterium Haemophilus influenzae.

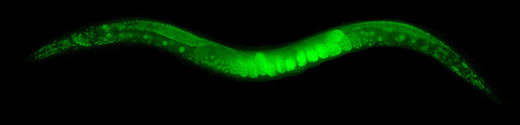
The worm Caenorhabditis elegans was the first animal to have its whole genome sequenced.

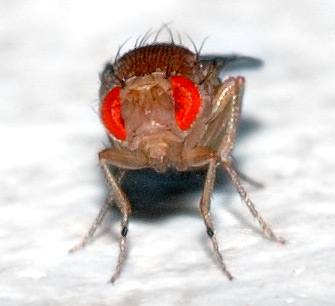
Drosophila melanogaster's whole genome was sequenced in 2000.

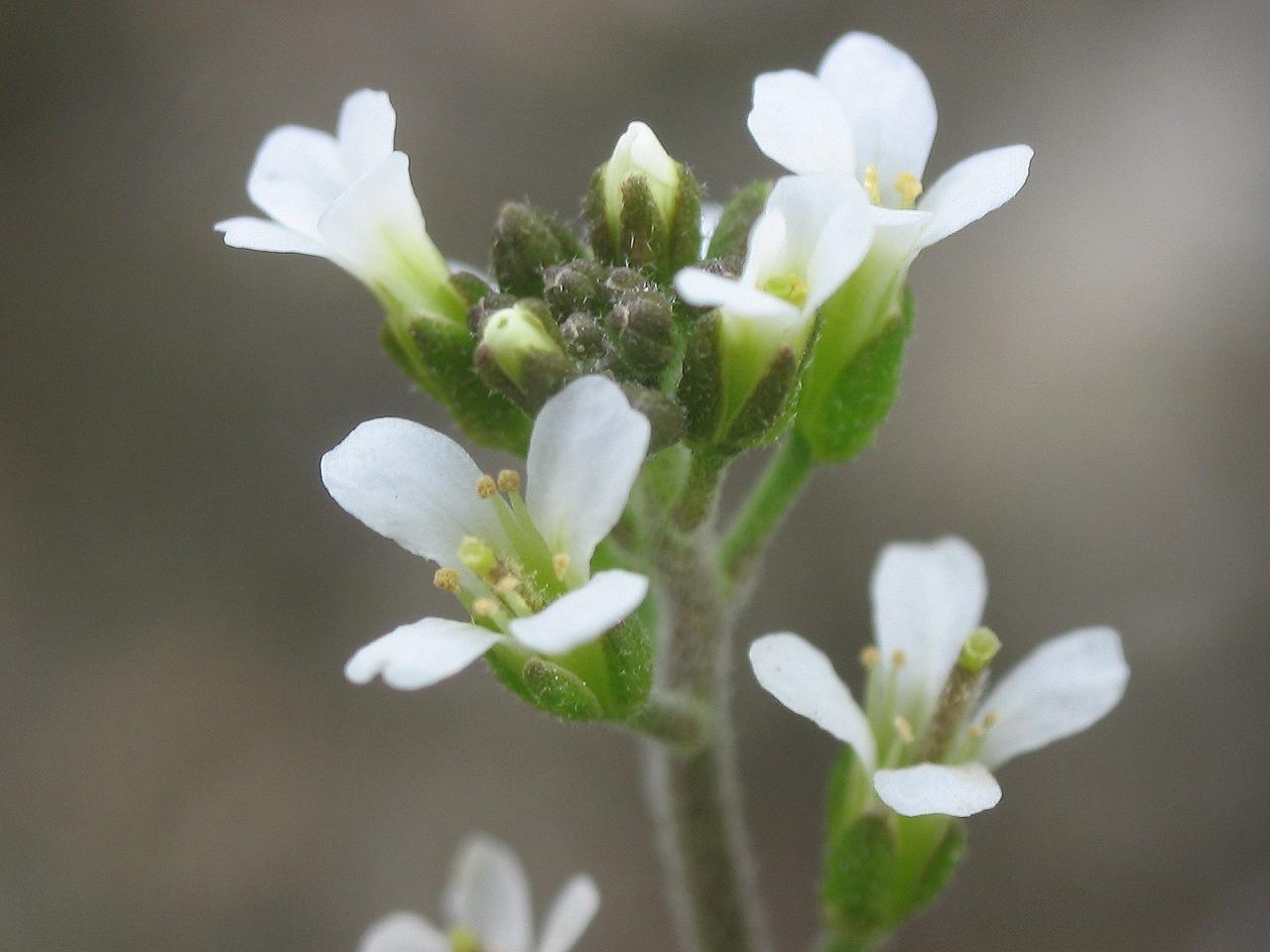
Arabidopsis thaliana was the first plant genome sequenced.

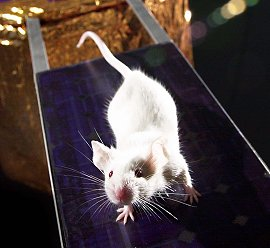
The genome of the lab mouse Mus musculus was published in 2002.

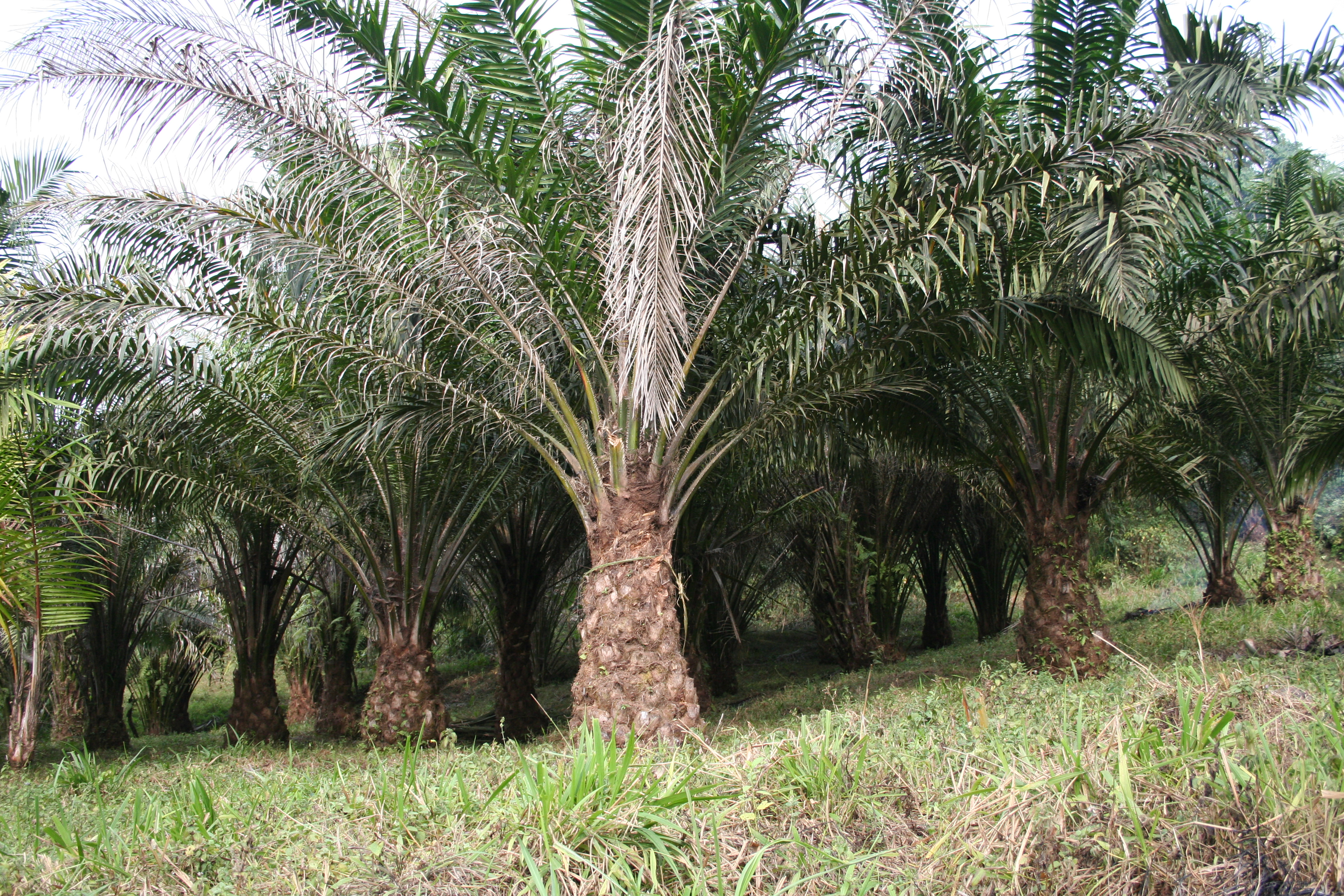
It took 10 years and 50 scientists spanning the globe to sequence the genome of Elaeis guineensis (oil palm). This genome was particularly difficult to sequence because it had many repeated sequences which are difficult to organise.

The DNA sequencing methods used in the 1970s and 1980s were manual; for example, Maxam–Gilbert sequencing and Sanger sequencing. Several whole bacteriophage and animal viral genomes were sequenced by these techniques, but the shift to more rapid, automated sequencing methods in the 1990s facilitated the sequencing of the larger bacterial and eukaryotic genomes.

The first virus to have its complete genome sequenced was the Bacteriophage MS2 by 1976. In 1992, yeast chromosome III was the first chromosome of any organism to be fully sequenced. The first organism whose entire genome was fully sequenced was Haemophilus influenzae in 1995. After it, the genomes of other bacteria and some archaea were first sequenced, largely due to their small genome size. H. influenzae has a genome of 1,830,140 base pairs of DNA. In contrast, eukaryotes, both unicellular and multicellular such as Amoeba dubia and humans (Homo sapiens) respectively, have much larger genomes (see C-value paradox). Amoeba dubia has a genome of 700 billion nucleotide pairs spread across thousands of chromosomes. Humans contain fewer nucleotide pairs (about 3.2 billion in each germ cell – note the exact size of the human genome is still being revised) than A. dubia, however, their genome size far outweighs the genome size of individual bacteria.

The first bacterial and archaeal genomes, including that of H. influenzae, were sequenced by Shotgun sequencing. In 1996, the first eukaryotic genome (Saccharomyces cerevisiae) was sequenced. S. cerevisiae, a model organism in biology has a genome of only around 12 million nucleotide pairs, and was the first unicellular eukaryote to have its whole genome sequenced. The first multicellular eukaryote, and animal, to have its whole genome sequenced was the nematode worm: Caenorhabditis elegans in 1998. Eukaryotic genomes are sequenced by several methods including Shotgun sequencing of short DNA fragments and sequencing of larger DNA clones from DNA libraries such as bacterial artificial chromosomes (BACs) and yeast artificial chromosomes (YACs).

In 1999, the entire DNA sequence of human chromosome 22, the second shortest human autosome, was published. By the year 2000, the second animal and second invertebrate (yet first insect) genome was sequenced – that of the fruit fly Drosophila melanogaster – a popular choice of model organism in experimental research. The first plant genome – that of the model organism Arabidopsis thaliana – was also fully sequenced by 2000. By 2001, a draft of the entire human genome sequence was published. The genome of the laboratory mouse Mus musculus was completed in 2002.

In 2004, the Human Genome Project published an incomplete version of the human genome. In 2008, a group from Leiden, the Netherlands, reported the sequencing of the first female human genome (Marjolein Kriek).

Currently thousands of genomes have been wholly or partially sequenced.

== Experimental details ==
=== Cells used for sequencing ===
Almost any biological sample containing a full copy of the DNA – even a very small amount of DNA or ancient DNA – can provide the genetic material necessary for full genome sequencing. Such samples may include saliva, epithelial cells, bone marrow, hair (as long as the hair contains a hair follicle), seeds, plant leaves, or anything else that has DNA-containing cells.

The genome sequence of a single cell selected from a mixed population of cells can be determined using techniques of single cell genome sequencing. This has important advantages in environmental microbiology in cases where a single cell of a particular microorganism species can be isolated from a mixed population by microscopy on the basis of its morphological or other distinguishing characteristics. In such cases the normally necessary steps of isolation and growth of the organism in culture may be omitted, thus allowing the sequencing of a much greater spectrum of organism genomes.

Single cell genome sequencing is being tested as a method of preimplantation genetic diagnosis, wherein a cell from the embryo created by in vitro fertilization is taken and analyzed before embryo transfer into the uterus. After implantation, cell-free fetal DNA can be taken by simple venipuncture from the mother and used for whole genome sequencing of the fetus.

=== Early techniques ===
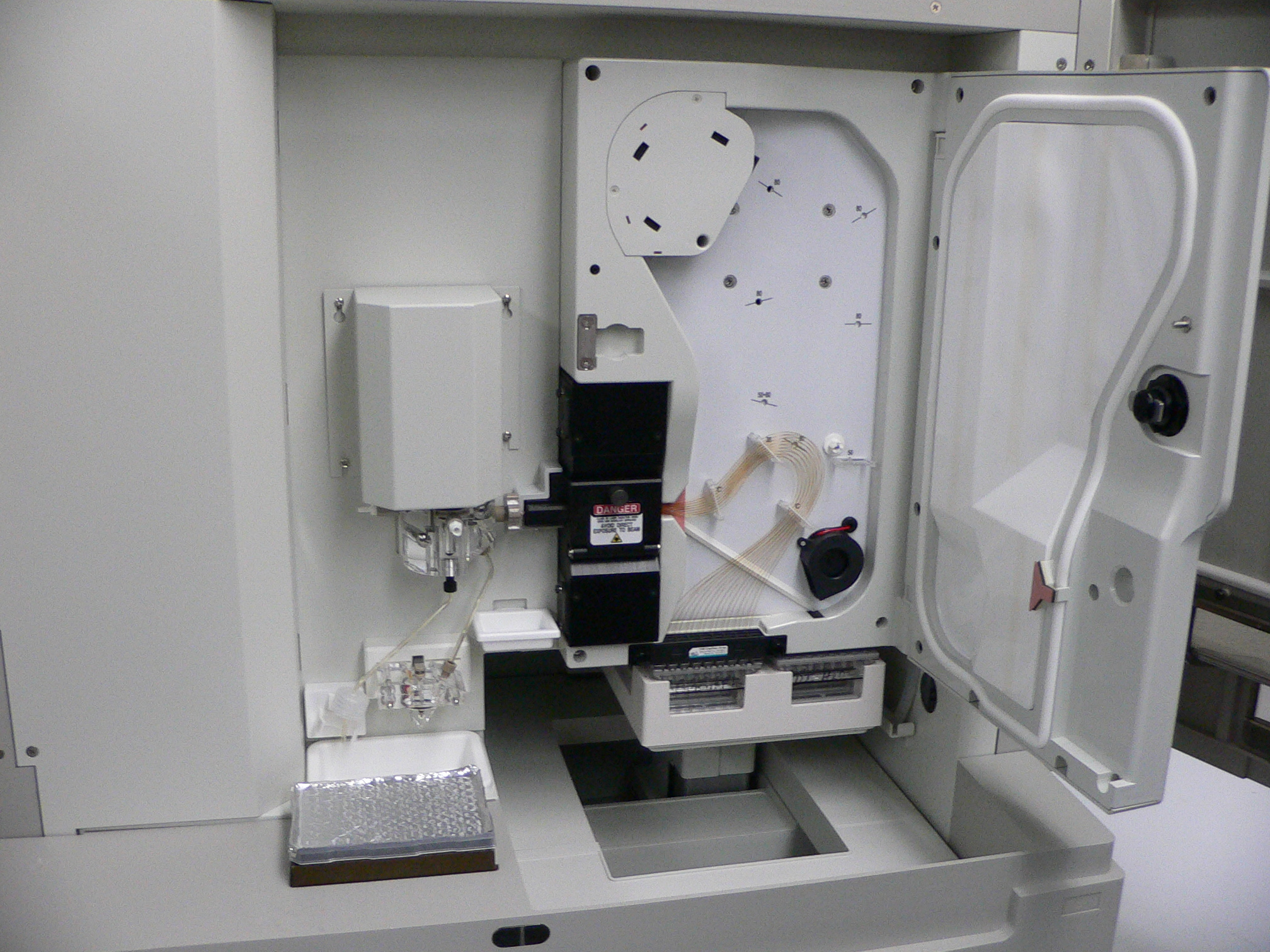
An ABI PRISM 3100 genetic analyzer. Such capillary sequencers automated the early efforts of sequencing genomes.

Sequencing of nearly an entire human genome was first accomplished in 2000 partly through the use of shotgun sequencing technology. While full genome shotgun sequencing for small (4000–7000 base pair) genomes was already in use in 1979, broader application benefited from pairwise end sequencing, known colloquially as double-barrel shotgun sequencing. As sequencing projects began to take on longer and more complicated genomes, multiple groups began to realize that useful information could be obtained by sequencing both ends of a fragment of DNA. Although sequencing both ends of the same fragment and keeping track of the paired data was more cumbersome than sequencing a single end of two distinct fragments, the knowledge that the two sequences were oriented in opposite directions and were about the length of a fragment apart from each other was valuable in reconstructing the sequence of the original target fragment.

The first published description of the use of paired ends was in 1990 as part of the sequencing of the human HPRT locus, although the use of paired ends was limited to closing gaps after the application of a traditional shotgun sequencing approach. The first theoretical description of a pure pairwise end sequencing strategy, assuming fragments of constant length, was in 1991. In 1995, the innovation of using fragments of varying sizes was introduced, and demonstrated that a pure pairwise end-sequencing strategy would be possible on large targets. The strategy was subsequently adopted by The Institute for Genomic Research (TIGR) to sequence the entire genome of the bacterium Haemophilus influenzae in 1995, and then by Celera Genomics to sequence the entire fruit fly genome in 2000, and subsequently the entire human genome. Applied Biosystems, now called Life Technologies, manufactured the automated capillary sequencers utilized by both Celera Genomics and The Human Genome Project.

=== Current techniques ===
While capillary sequencing was the first approach to successfully sequence a nearly full human genome, it is still too expensive and takes too long for commercial purposes. Since 2005, capillary sequencing has been progressively displaced by high-throughput (formerly "next-generation") sequencing technologies such as Illumina dye sequencing, pyrosequencing, and SMRT sequencing. All of these technologies continue to employ the basic shotgun strategy, namely, parallelization and template generation via genome fragmentation.

Long-read sequencing techniques have emerged, including nanopore technology. Though the sequencing accuracy of Nanopore technology is lower than those above, its read length is on average much longer. This generation of long reads is valuable especially in de novo whole-genome sequencing applications.

==== Telomere-to-telomere ====
Traditional sequencing techniques produced short reads that are pieced together using computer programs to form contigs and joined into assemblies. This technique works poorly for highly repetitive regions as programs have difficulty determining the length of these repetitive parts and distinguishing one repeat from a very similar one. These areas are left as gaps in the scaffolds, which are collections of contigs and approximately-sized gaps that represents an actual chromosome. The Human Genome Project, for example, managed to read and map 92% of the human genome, leaving 8% as gaps.

Long-read sequencing allows for much longer reads that potentially span the entirety of a repetitive region, allowing researchers and their computer programs to unambiguously determine the length and identity of individual regions. When a genome is complete enough to result in a single contig (without gaps) for each linear chromosome, starting and ending with the telomeric regions, it is called telomere-to-telomere (T2T). The human T2T genome was published in 2022. (It includes 24 contigs for the 22 autosomes, X chromosome, and mtDNA. It is arguably only "near-T2T" because the rDNA arrays are not assembled.) Experts differ on how they define "T2T" and "near-T2T" or "nearly T2T".

=== Analysis ===
In principle, full genome sequencing can provide the raw nucleotide sequence of an individual organism's DNA at a single point in time. However, further analysis must be performed to provide the biological or medical meaning of this sequence, such as how this knowledge can be used to help prevent disease. Methods for analyzing sequencing data are being developed and refined.

Because sequencing generates a lot of data (for example, there are approximately six billion base pairs in each human diploid genome), its output is stored electronically and requires a large amount of computing power and storage capacity.

While analysis of WGS data can be slow, it is possible to speed up this step by using dedicated hardware.

== Commercialization ==
Total cost of sequencing a whole human genome as calculated by the NHGRI

A number of public and private companies are competing to develop a full genome sequencing platform that is commercially robust for both research and clinical use, including Illumina, Knome, Sequenom, 454 Life Sciences, Pacific Biosciences, Complete Genomics, Helicos Biosciences, GE Global Research (General Electric), Affymetrix, IBM, Intelligent Bio-Systems, Life Technologies, Oxford Nanopore Technologies, and the Beijing Genomics Institute. These companies are heavily financed and backed by venture capitalists, hedge funds, and investment banks.

A commonly-referenced commercial target for sequencing cost until the late 2010s was US$1,000; however, the private companies are working to reach a new target of only $100.

=== Incentive ===
In October 2006, the X Prize Foundation, working in collaboration with the J. Craig Venter Science Foundation, established the Archon X Prize for Genomics, intending to award $10 million to "the first team that can build a device and use it to sequence 100 human genomes within 10 days or less, with an accuracy of no more than one error in every 1,000,000 bases sequenced, with sequences accurately covering at least 98% of the genome, and at a recurring cost of no more than $1,000 per genome". The Archon X Prize for Genomics was cancelled in 2013, before its official start date.

=== History ===
In 2007, Applied Biosystems started selling a new type of sequencer called SOLiD System. The technology allowed users to sequence 60 gigabases per run.

In June 2009, Illumina announced that they were launching their own personal full genome sequencing service at a depth of 30× for $48,000 per genome. In August, the founder of Helicos Biosciences, Stephen Quake, stated that using the company's Single Molecule Sequencer he sequenced his own full genome for less than $50,000. In November, Complete Genomics published a peer-reviewed paper in Science demonstrating its ability to sequence a complete human genome for $1,700.

In May 2011, Illumina lowered its Full Genome Sequencing service to $5,000 per human genome, or $4,000 if ordering 50 or more. Helicos Biosciences, Pacific Biosciences, Complete Genomics, Illumina, Sequenom, ION Torrent Systems, Halcyon Molecular, NABsys, IBM, and GE Global appear to all be going head to head in the race to commercialize full genome sequencing.

With sequencing costs declining, a number of companies began claiming that their equipment would soon achieve the $1,000 genome: these companies included Life Technologies in January 2012, Oxford Nanopore Technologies in February 2012, and Illumina in February 2014. In 2015, the NHGRI estimated the cost of obtaining a whole-genome sequence at around $1,500. In 2016, Veritas Genetics began selling whole genome sequencing, including a report as to some of the information in the sequencing for $999. In summer 2019, Veritas Genetics cut the cost for WGS to $599. In 2017, BGI began offering WGS for $600.

However, in 2015, some noted that effective use of whole gene sequencing can cost considerably more than $1000. Also, reportedly there remain parts of the human genome that have not been fully sequenced by 2017.

== Comparison with other technologies ==
=== DNA microarrays ===
Full genome sequencing provides information on a genome that is orders of magnitude larger than by DNA arrays, the previous leader in genotyping technology.

For humans, DNA arrays currently provide genotypic information on up to one million genetic variants, while full genome sequencing will provide information on all six billion bases in the human genome, or 3,000 times more data. Because of this, full genome sequencing is considered a disruptive innovation to the DNA array markets as the accuracy of both range from 99.98% to 99.999% (in non-repetitive DNA regions) and their consumables cost of $5000 per 6 billion base pairs is competitive (for some applications) with DNA arrays ($500 per 1 million basepairs).

== Applications ==
=== Mutation frequencies ===
Whole genome sequencing has established the mutation frequency for whole human genomes. The mutation frequency in the whole genome between generations for humans (parent to child) is about 70 new mutations per generation. An even lower level of variation was found comparing whole genome sequencing in blood cells for a pair of monozygotic (identical twins) 100-year-old centenarians. Only 8 somatic differences were found, though somatic variation occurring in less than 20% of blood cells would be undetected.

In the specifically protein coding regions of the human genome, it is estimated that there are about 0.35 mutations that would change the protein sequence between parent/child generations (less than one mutated protein per generation).

In cancer, mutation frequencies are much higher, due to genome instability. This frequency can further depend on patient age, exposure to DNA damaging agents (such as UV-irradiation or components of tobacco smoke) and the activity/inactivity of DNA repair mechanisms. Furthermore, mutation frequency can vary between cancer types: in germline cells, mutation rates occur at approximately 0.023 mutations per megabase, but this number is much higher in breast cancer (1.18-1.66 somatic mutations per Mb), in lung cancer (17.7) or in melanomas (≈33). Since the haploid human genome consists of approximately 3,200 megabases, this translates into about 74 mutations (mostly in noncoding regions) in germline DNA per generation, but 3,776-5,312 somatic mutations per haploid genome in breast cancer, 56,640 in lung cancer and 105,600 in melanomas.

The distribution of somatic mutations across the human genome is very uneven, such that the gene-rich, early-replicating regions receive fewer mutations than gene-poor, late-replicating heterochromatin, likely due to differential DNA repair activity. In particular, the histone modification H3K9me3 is associated with high, and H3K36me3 with low mutation frequencies.

=== Genome-wide association studies ===
In research, whole-genome sequencing can be used in a genome-wide association study (GWAS) – a project aiming to determine the genetic variant or variants associated with a disease or some other phenotype.

=== Diagnostic use ===
In 2009, Illumina released its first whole genome sequencers that were approved for clinical as opposed to research-only use and doctors at academic medical centers began quietly using them to try to diagnose what was wrong with people whom standard approaches had failed to help.

The first clinical example of application of this technology was in July 2009; and was an attempt to diagnose a child being treated at Milwaukee Children's Hospital who had early onset refractory IBD necessitating around 100 surgeries by the time he was three years old. His doctor, Allan Mayer, turned to Geneticist Dr. Howard Jacob at MCW to see if whole genome sequencing could be applied to determine the problem. Lead computational biologist Dr. Worthey, making use of software rapidly developed by a small team of software developers, was able to identify a rare mutation in the XIAP that was causing the problems and this diagnosis altered the patients treatment, saving his life. By early 2010 Drs Jacob and Worthey, along with Dr. David Dimmock had stood up the first whole genome based genetics clinic and molecular diagnostic lab, routinely sequencing and analysing the genomes of patients with undiagnosed diseases. This diagnostic lab diagnose thousands of rare disease patients from around the world, continuing to this day.

In 2010, a team from Stanford led by Euan Ashley performed analysis of a full human genome, that of bioengineer Stephen Quake. In 2011, Ashley's team reported whole genome molecular autopsy and in 2011, extended the interpretation framework to a fully sequenced family, the West family, who were the first family to be sequenced on the Illumina platform. The price to sequence a genome at that time was US$19,50, which was billed to the patient but usually paid for out of a research grant; one person at that time had applied for reimbursement from their insurance company.

Due to recent cost reductions (see above) whole genome sequencing has become a realistic application in DNA diagnostics. In 2013, the 3Gb-TEST consortium obtained funding from the European Union to prepare the health care system for these innovations in DNA diagnostics. Quality assessment schemes, health technology assessment and guidelines have to be in place. The 3Gb-TEST consortium has identified the analysis and interpretation of sequence data as the most complicated step in the diagnostic process. At the Consortium meeting in Athens in September 2014, the Consortium coined the word genotranslation for this crucial step. This step leads to a so-called genoreport. Guidelines are needed to determine the required content of these reports.

Genomes2People (G2P), an initiative of Brigham and Women's Hospital and Harvard Medical School was created in 2011 to examine the integration of genomic sequencing into clinical care of adults and children. G2P's director, Robert C. Green, had previously led the REVEAL study – Risk EValuation and Education for Alzheimer's Disease – a series of clinical trials exploring patient reactions to the knowledge of their genetic risk for Alzheimer's.

In 2018, researchers at Rady Children's Hospital Institute for Genomic Medicine in San Diego determined that rapid whole-genome sequencing (rWGS) could diagnose genetic disorders in time to change acute medical or surgical management (clinical utility) and improve outcomes in acutely ill infants. In a retrospective cohort study of acutely ill inpatient infants in a regional children's hospital from July 2016-March 2017, forty-two families received rWGS for etiologic diagnosis of genetic disorders. The diagnostic sensitivity of rWGS was 43% (eighteen of 42 infants) and 10% (four of 42 infants) for standard genetic tests (P = .0005). The rate of clinical utility of rWGS (31%, thirteen of 42 infants) was significantly greater than for standard genetic tests (2%, one of 42; P = .0015). Eleven (26%) infants with diagnostic rWGS avoided morbidity, one had a 43% reduction in likelihood of mortality, and one started palliative care. In six of the eleven infants, the changes in management reduced inpatient cost by $800,000–2,000,000. The findings replicated a prior study of the clinical utility of rWGS in acutely ill inpatient infants, and demonstrated improved outcomes, net healthcare savings and consideration as a first tier test in this setting.

A 2018 review of 36 publications found the cost for whole genome sequencing to range from US$1,906to US$24,810and have a wide variance in diagnostic yield from 17% to 73% depending on patient groups.

=== Rare variant association study ===
Whole genome sequencing studies enable the assessment of associations between complex traits and both coding and noncoding rare variants (minor allele frequency (MAF) < 1%) across the genome. Single-variant analyses typically have low power to identify associations with rare variants, and variant set tests have been proposed to jointly test the effects of given sets of multiple rare variants. SNP annotations help to prioritize rare functional variants, and incorporating these annotations can effectively boost the power of genetic association of rare variants analysis of whole genome sequencing studies. Some tools have been specifically developed to provide all-in-one rare variant association analysis for whole-genome sequencing data, including integration of genotype data and their functional annotations, association analysis, result summary and visualization.

Meta-analysis of whole genome sequencing studies provides an attractive solution to the problem of collecting large sample sizes for discovering rare variants associated with complex phenotypes. Some methods have been developed to enable functionally informed rare variant association analysis in biobank-scale cohorts using efficient approaches for summary statistic storage.

=== Oncology ===
In this field, whole genome sequencing represents a great set of improvements and challenges to be faced by the scientific community, as it makes it possible to analyze, quantify and characterize circulating tumor DNA (ctDNA) in the bloodstream. This serves as a basis for early cancer diagnosis, treatment selection and relapse monitoring, as well as for determining the mechanisms of resistance, metastasis and phylogenetic patterns in the evolution of cancer. It can also help in the selection of individualized treatments for patients suffering from this pathology and observe how existing drugs are working during the progression of treatment. Deep whole genome sequencing involves a subclonal reconstruction based on ctDNA in plasma that allows for complete epigenomic and genomic profiling, showing the expression of circulating tumor DNA in each case.

=== Newborn screening ===
In 2013, Green and a team of researchers launched the BabySeq Project to study the ethical and medical consequences of sequencing a newborn's DNA. As of 2015, whole genome and exome sequencing as a newborn screening tool were deliberated and in 2021, further discussed. In 2021, the NIH funded BabySeq2, an implementation study that expanded the BabySeq project, enrolling 500 infants from diverse families and track the effects of their genomic sequencing on their pediatric care.

In 2023, the Lancet opined that in the UK "focusing on improving screening by upgrading targeted gene panels might be more sensible in the short term. Whole genome sequencing in the long term deserves thorough examination and universal caution."

== Ethical concerns ==
The introduction of whole genome sequencing may have ethical implications. On one hand, genetic testing can potentially diagnose preventable diseases, both in the individual undergoing genetic testing and in their relatives. On the other hand, genetic testing has potential downsides such as genetic discrimination, loss of anonymity, and psychological impacts such as discovery of non-paternity.

Some ethicists insist that the privacy of individuals undergoing genetic testing must be protected, and is of particular concern when minors undergo genetic testing. Illumina's CEO, Jay Flatley, wrongly claimed in February 2009 that "by 2019 it will have become routine to map infants' genes when they are born". This potential use of genome sequencing is highly controversial, as it runs counter to established ethical norms for predictive genetic testing of asymptomatic minors that have been well established in the fields of medical genetics and genetic counseling. The traditional guidelines for genetic testing have been developed over the course of several decades since it first became possible to test for genetic markers associated with disease, prior to the advent of cost-effective, comprehensive genetic screening.

When an individual undergoes whole genome sequencing, they reveal information about not only their own DNA sequences, but also about probable DNA sequences of their close genetic relatives. This information can further reveal useful predictive information about relatives' present and future health risks. Hence, there are important questions about what obligations, if any, are owed to the family members of the individuals who are undergoing genetic testing. In Western/European society, tested individuals are usually encouraged to share important information on any genetic diagnoses with their close relatives, since the importance of the genetic diagnosis for offspring and other close relatives is usually one of the reasons for seeking a genetic testing in the first place. Nevertheless, a major ethical dilemma can develop when the patients refuse to share information on a diagnosis that is made for serious genetic disorder that is highly preventable and where there is a high risk to relatives carrying the same disease mutation. Under such circumstances, the clinician may suspect that the relatives would rather know of the diagnosis and hence the clinician can face a conflict of interest with respect to patient-doctor confidentiality.

Privacy concerns can also arise when whole genome sequencing is used in scientific research studies. Researchers often need to put information on patient's genotypes and phenotypes into public scientific databases, such as locus specific databases. Although only anonymous patient data are submitted to locus specific databases, patients might still be identifiable by their relatives in the case of finding a rare disease or a rare missense mutation. Public discussion around the introduction of advanced forensic techniques (such as advanced familial searching using public DNA ancestry websites and DNA phenotyping approaches) has been limited, disjointed, and unfocused. As forensic genetics and medical genetics converge toward genome sequencing, issues surrounding genetic data become increasingly connected, and additional legal protections may need to be established.

== Public human genome sequences ==
=== First people with public genome sequences ===
The first nearly complete human genomes sequenced were two Americans of predominantly Northwestern European ancestry in 2007 (J. Craig Venter at 7.5-fold coverage, and James Watson at 7.4-fold). This was followed in 2008 by sequencing of an anonymous Han Chinese man (at 36-fold), a Yoruban man from Nigeria (at 30-fold), a female clinical geneticist (Marjolein Kriek) from the Netherlands (at 7 to 8-fold), and a female leukemia patient in her mid-50s (at 33 and 14-fold coverage for tumor and normal tissues). Steve Jobs was among the first 20 people to have their whole genome sequenced, reportedly for the cost of $100,000. As of June 2012, there were 69 nearly complete human genomes publicly available. In November 2013, a Spanish family made their personal genomics data publicly available under a Creative Commons public domain license. The work was led by Manuel Corpas and the data obtained by direct-to-consumer genetic testing with 23andMe and the Beijing Genomics Institute. This is believed to be the first such public genomics dataset for a whole family.

=== Databases ===
According to Science, the major databases of whole genomes are:

Biobank	Completed whole genomes	Release/access information
UK Biobank	500,000	Made available through a Web platform in November 2021, it is the largest public dataset of whole genomes. The genomes are linked to anonymized medical information and are made more accessible for biomedical research than prior, less comprehensive datasets. 300,000 more genomes were released in early 2023.
Trans-Omics for Precision Medicine	161,000	National Institutes of Health (NIH) requires project-specific consent
Million Veteran Program	125,000	Non–Veterans Affairs researchers get access in 2022
Genomics England's 100,000 Genomes	120,000	Researchers must join collaboration
All of Us	90,000	NIH expects to release by early 2022

== Genomic coverage ==
In terms of genomic coverage and accuracy, whole genome sequencing can broadly be classified into either of the following:

- A draft sequence, covering approximately 90% of the genome at approximately 99.9% accuracy
- A finished sequence, covering more than 95% of the genome at approximately 99.99% accuracy

Producing a truly high-quality finished sequence by this definition is very expensive. Thus, most human "whole genome sequencing" results are draft sequences (sometimes above and sometimes below the accuracy defined above).

== See also ==
- Coverage (genetics)
- DNA microarray
- DNA profiling
- DNA sequencing
- Duplex sequencing
- Exome sequencing
- Genomics England
- Horizontal correlation
- Human Genome Project
- Lists of sequenced genomes
- Medical genetics
- Medical Research Council (MRC)
- Nucleic acid sequence
- Personal Genome Project
- Personalized medicine
- Predictive medicine
- Rare functional variant
- Single cell sequencing
- SNP annotation
