= SNP annotation =

- Classification: Bioinformatics
- Subclassification: Single-nucleotide polymorphism
- Type of tools used: Functional annotation tools
- Other subjects related: Genome project, Genomics

Single nucleotide polymorphism annotation (SNP annotation) is the process of predicting the effect or function of an individual SNP using SNP annotation tools. In SNP annotation the biological information is extracted, collected and displayed in a clear form amenable to query. SNP functional annotation is typically performed based on the available information on nucleic acid and protein sequences.

== Introduction ==
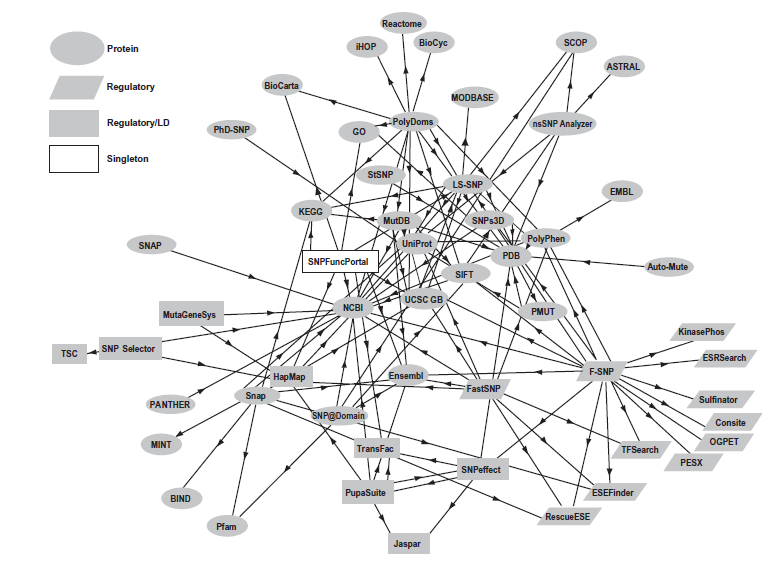
Directed graph of relationships among SNP prediction webservers and their bioinformatics sources.

Single nucleotide polymorphisms (SNPs) play an important role in genome wide association studies because they act as primary biomarkers. SNPs are currently the marker of choice due to their large numbers in virtually all populations of individuals. The location of these biomarkers can be tremendously important in terms of predicting functional significance, genetic mapping and population genetics. Each SNP represents a nucleotide change between two individuals at a defined location. SNPs are the most common genetic variant found in all individual with one SNP every 100–300 bp in some species. Since there is a massive number of SNPs on the genome, there is a clear need to prioritize SNPs according to their potential effect in order to expedite genotyping and analysis.

Annotating large numbers of SNPs is a difficult and complex process, which need computational methods to handle such a large dataset. Many tools available have been developed for SNP annotation in different organisms: some of them are optimized for use with organisms densely sampled for SNPs (such as humans), but there are currently few tools available that are species non-specific or support non-model organism data. The majority of SNP annotation tools provide computationally predicted putative deleterious effects of SNPs. These tools examine whether a SNP resides in functional genomic regions such as exons, splice sites, or transcription regulatory sites, and predict the potential corresponding functional effects that the SNP may have using a variety of machine-learning approaches. But the tools and systems that prioritize functionally significant SNPs, suffer from few limitations: First, they examine the putative deleterious effects of SNPs with respect to a single biological function that provide only partial information about the functional significance of SNPs. Second, current systems classify SNPs into deleterious or neutral group.

Rare variants are defined as single nucleotide polymorphisms (SNPs) with a minor allele frequency (MAF) of less than 0.01. As a consequence, training data for the corresponding prediction methods may be different and hence one should be careful to select the appropriate tool for a specific purpose. For the purposes of this article, "SNP" will be used to mean both SNP and SNV, but readers should bear in mind the differences.

== SNP annotation ==
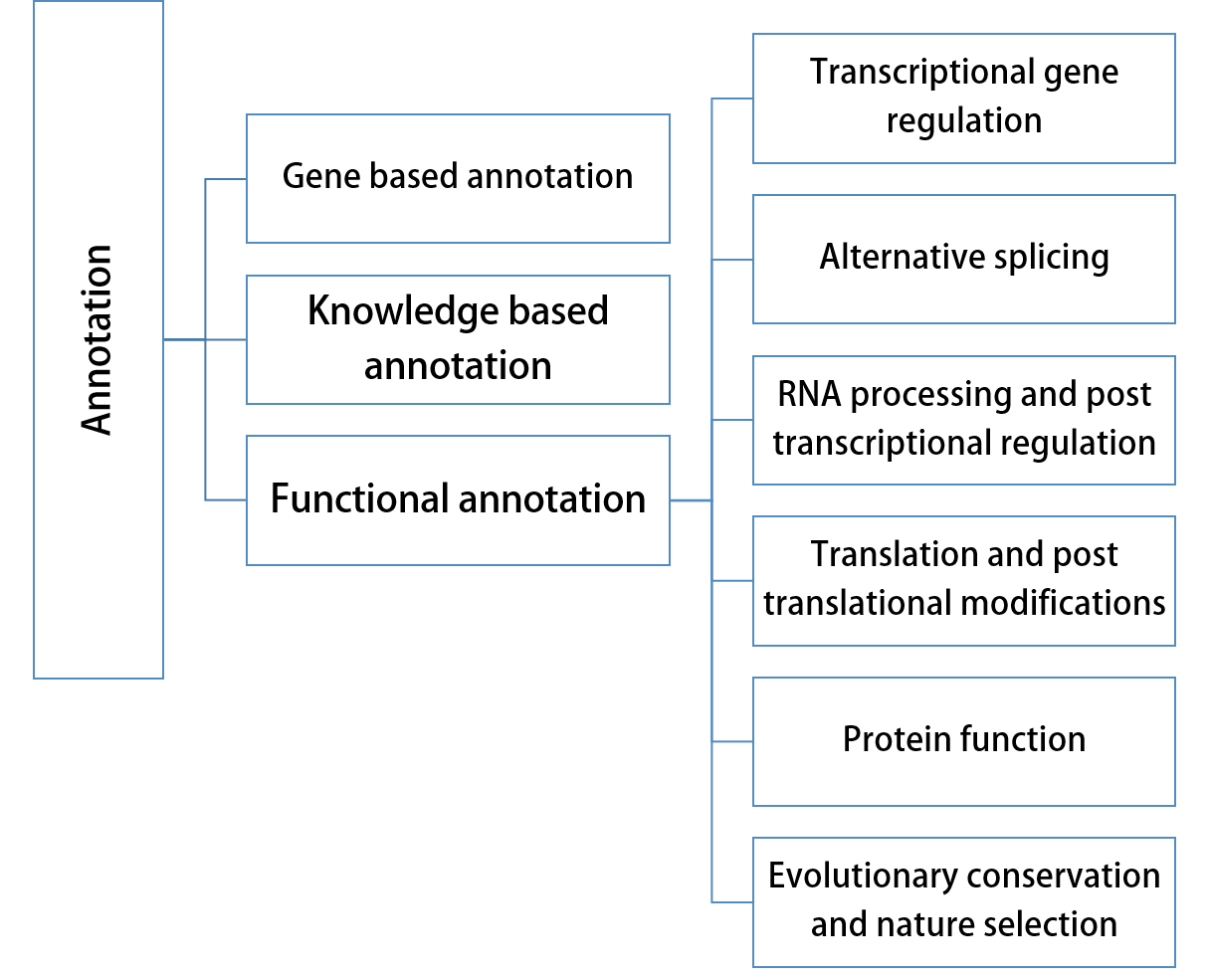
Different type of annotations in genomics

For SNP annotation, many kinds of genetic and genomic information are used. Based on the different features used by each annotation tool, SNP annotation methods may be split roughly into the following categories:

=== Gene based annotation ===
Genomic information from surrounding genomic elements is among the most useful information for interpreting the biological function of an observed variant. Information from a known gene is used as a reference to indicate whether the observed variant resides in or near a gene and if it has the potential to disrupt the protein sequence and its function. Gene based annotation is based on the fact that non-synonymous mutations can alter the protein sequence and that splice site mutation may disrupt the transcript splicing pattern.

=== Knowledge based annotation ===
Knowledge base annotation is done based on the information of gene attribute, protein function and its metabolism. In this type of annotation more emphasis is given to genetic variation that disrupts the protein function domain, protein-protein interaction and biological pathway. The non-coding region of genome contain many important regulatory elements including promoter, enhancer and insulator, any kind of change in this regulatory region can change the functionality of that protein. The mutation in DNA can change the RNA sequence and then influence the RNA secondary structure, RNA binding protein recognition and miRNA binding activity.

=== Functional annotation ===
This method mainly identifies variant function based on the information whether the variant loci are in the known functional region that harbor genomic or epigenomic signals. The function of non-coding variants are extensive in terms of the affected genomic region and they involve in almost all processes of gene regulation from transcriptional to post translational level

==== Transcriptional gene regulation ====
Transcriptional gene regulation process depends on many spatial and temporal factors in the nucleus such as global or local chromatin states, nucleosome positioning, TF binding, enhancer/promoter activities. Variant that alter the function of any of these biological processes may alter the gene regulation and cause phenotypic abnormality. Genetic variants that located in distal regulatory region can affect the binding motif of TFs, chromatin regulators and other distal transcriptional factors, which disturb the interaction between enhancer/silencer and its target gene.

==== Alternative splicing ====
Alternative splicing is one of the most important components that show functional complexity of genome. Modified splicing has significant effect on the phenotype that is relevance to disease or drug metabolism. A change in splicing can be caused by modifying any of the components of the splicing machinery such as splice sites or splice enhancers or silencers. Modification in the alternative splicing site can lead to a different protein form which will show a different function. Humans use an estimated 100,000 different proteins or more, so some genes must be capable of coding for a lot more than just one protein. Alternative splicing occurs more frequently than was previously thought and can be hard to control; genes may produce tens of thousands of different transcripts, necessitating a new gene model for each alternative splice.

==== RNA processing and post transcriptional regulation ====
Mutations in the untranslated region (UTR) affect many post-transcriptional regulation. Distinctive structural features are required for many RNA molecules and cis-acting regulatory elements to execute effective functions during gene regulation. SNVs can alter the secondary structure of RNA molecules and then disrupt the proper folding of RNAs, such as tRNA/mRNA/lncRNA folding and miRNA binding recognition regions.

==== Translation and post translational modifications ====
Single nucleotide variant can also affect the cis-acting regulatory elements in mRNA's to inhibit/promote the translation initiation. Change in the synonymous codons region due to mutation may affect the translation efficiency because of codon usage biases. The translation elongation can also be retarded by mutations along the ramp of ribosomal movement. In the post-translational level, genetic variants can contribute to proteostasis and amino acid modifications. However, mechanisms of variant effect in this field are complicated and there are only a few tools available to predict variant's effect on translation related modifications.

==== Protein function ====
Non-synonymous is the variant in exons that change the amino acid sequence encoded by the gene, including single base changes and non frameshift indels. It has been extremely investigated the function of non-synonymous variants on protein and many algorithms have been developed to predict the deleteriousness and pathogenesis of single nucleotide variants (SNVs). Classical bioinformatics tools, such as SIFT, Polyphen and MutationTaster, successfully predict the functional consequence of non-synonymous substitution. PopViz webserver provides a gene-centric approach to visualize the mutation damage prediction scores (CADD, SIFT, PolyPhen-2) or the population genetics (minor allele frequency) versus the amino acid positions of all coding variants of a certain human gene. PopViz is also cross-linked with UniProt database, where the protein domain information can be found, and to then identify the predicted deleterious variants fall into these protein domains on the PopViz plot.

==== Evolutionary conservation and nature selection ====
Comparative genomics approaches were used to predict the function-relevant variants under the assumption that the functional genetic locus should be conserved across different species at an extensive phylogenetic distance. On the other hand, some adaptive traits and the population differences are driven by positive selections of advantageous variants, and these genetic mutations are functionally relevant to population specific phenotypes. Functional prediction of variants' effect in different biological processes is pivotal to pinpoint the molecular mechanism of diseases/traits and direct the experimental validation.

== List of available SNP annotation tools ==
To annotate the vast amounts of available NGS data, currently a large number of SNPs annotation tools are available. Some of them are specific to specific SNPs while others are more general. Some of the available SNPs annotation tools are as follows SNPeff, Ensembl Variant Effect Predictor (VEP), ANNOVAR, FATHMM, PhD-SNP, PolyPhen-2, SuSPect, F-SNP, AnnTools, SeattleSeq, SNPit, SCAN, Snap, SNPs&GO, LS-SNP, Snat, TREAT, TRAMS, Maviant, MutationTaster, SNPdat, Snpranker, NGS – SNP, SVA, VARIANT, SIFT, LIST-S2, PhD-SNP and FAST-SNP. The functions and approaches used in SNPs annotation tools are listed below.

Tools	Description	External resources use	WebsiteURL	References
PhyreRisk	Maps genetics variants onto experimental and predicted protein structures	Variant effect predictor, UniProt, Protein Data Bank, SIFTS, Phyre2 for predicted structures	http://phyrerisk.bc.ic.ac.uk/home	
Missense3D	Reports structural impact of a missense variant onto PDB and user-supplied protein coordinates. Developed to be applicable to experimental and predicted protein structures	Protein Data Bank, Phyre2 for predicted structures	http://www.sbg.bio.ic.ac.uk/~missense3d/	
SNPeff	SnpEff annotates variants based on their genomic locations and predicts coding effects. Uses an interval forest approach	ENSEMBL, UCSC and organism based e.g. FlyBase, WormBase and TAIR	https://snpeff.sourceforge.net/SnpEff_manual.html	
Ensembl VEP	Determines effects of variants (SNPs, insertions, deletions, CNVs or structural variants) on genes, transcripts, proteins and regulatory regions	dbSNP, RefSeq, UniProt, COSMIC, PDBe, 1000 Genomes, gnomAD, PubMed		
ANNOVAR	This tool is suitable for pinpointing a small subset of functionally important variants. Uses mutation prediction approach for annotation	UCSC, RefSeq and Ensembl	http://annovar.openbioinformatics.org/	
Jannovar	This is a tool and library for genome annotation	RefSeq, Ensembl, UCSC, etc.	https://github.com/charite/jannovar	
PhD-SNP	SVM-based method using sequence information retrieved by BLAST algorithm.	UniRef90	http://snps.biofold.org/phd-snp/	
PolyPhen-2	Suitable for predicting damaging effects of missense mutations. Uses sequence conservation, structure to model position of amino acid substitution, and SWISS-PROT annotation	UniProt	http://genetics.bwh.harvard.edu/pph2/	
MutationTaster	Suitable for predicting damaging effects of all intragenic mutations (DNA and protein level), including InDels.	Ensembl, 1000 Genomes Project, ExAC, UniProt, ClinVar, phyloP, phastCons, nnsplice, polyadq (...)	http://www.mutationtaster.org/	
SuSPect	An SVM-trained predictor of the damaging effects of missense mutations. Uses sequence conservation, structure and network (interactome) information to model phenotypic effect of amino acid substitution. Accepts VCF file	UniProt, PDB, Phyre2 for predicted structures, DOMINE and STRING for interactome	http://www.sbg.bio.ic.ac.uk/suspect/index.html	
F-SNP	Computationally predicts functional SNPs for disease association studies.	PolyPhen, SIFT, SNPeffect, SNPs3D, LS-SNP, ESEfinder, RescueESE, ESRSearch, PESX, Ensembl, TFSearch, Consite, GoldenPath, Ensembl, KinasePhos, OGPET, Sulfinator, GoldenPath	http://compbio.cs.queensu.ca/F-SNP/	
AnnTools	Design to Identify novel and SNP/SNV, INDEL and SV/CNV. AnnTools searches for overlaps with regulatory elements, disease/trait associated loci, known segmental duplications and artifact prone regions	dbSNP, UCSC, GATK refGene, GAD, published lists of common structural genomic variation, Database of Genomic Variants, lists of conserved TFBs, miRNA	https://anntools.sourceforge.net/	
SNPit	Analyses the potential functional significance of SNPs derived from genome wide association studies	dbSNP, EntrezGene, UCSC Browser, HGMD, ECR Browser, Haplotter, SIFT	-/-	
SCAN	Uses physical and functional based annotation to categorize according to their position relative to genes and according to linkage disequilibrium (LD) patterns and effects on expression levels	-/-	http://www.scandb.org/newinterface/about.html	
SNAP	A neural network-based method for the prediction of the functional effects of non-synonymous SNPs	Ensembl, UCSC, Uniprot, UniProt, Pfam, DAS-CBS, MINT, BIND, KEGG, TreeFam	http://www.rostlab.org/services/SNAP	
SNPs&GO	SVM-based method using sequence information, Gene Ontology annotation and when available protein structure.	UniRef90, GO, PANTHER, PDB	http://snps.biofold.org/snps-and-go/	
LS-SNP	Maps nsSNPs onto protein sequences, functional pathways and comparative protein structure models	UniProtKB, Genome Browser, dbSNP, PD	http://www.salilab.org/LS-SNP	
TREAT	TREAT is a tool for facile navigation and mining of the variants from both targeted resequencing and whole exome sequencing	-/-	http://ndc.mayo.edu/mayo/research/biostat/stand-alone-packages.cfm	
SNPdat	Suitable for species non-specific or support non-model organism data. SNPdat does not require the creation of any local relational databases or pre-processing of any mandatory input files	-/-	https://code.google.com/p/snpdat/downloads/	
NGS – SNP	Annotate SNPs comparing the reference amino acid and the non-reference amino acid to each orthologue	Ensembl, NCBI and UniProt	http://stothard.afns.ualberta.ca/downloads/NGS-SNP/	
SVA	Predicted biological function to variants identified	NCBI RefSeq, Ensembl, variation databases, UCSC, HGNC, GO, KEGG, HapMap, 1000 Genomes Project and DG	http://www.svaproject.org/	
VARIANT	VARIANT increases the information scope outside the coding regions by including all the available information on regulation, DNA structure, conservation, evolutionary pressures, etc. Regulatory variants constitute a recognized, but still unexplored, cause of pathologies	dbSNP,1000 genomes, disease-related variants from GWAS, OMIM, COSMIC	http://variant.bioinfo.cipf.es/	
SIFT	SIFT is a program that predicts whether an amino acid substitution affects protein function. SIFT uses sequence homology to predict whether an amino acid substitution will affect protein function	PROT/TrEMBL, or NCBI's	http://blocks.fhcrc.org/sift/SIFT.html	
LIST-S2	LIST-S2 (Local Identity and Shared Taxa, Species-specific) is based on the assumption that variations observed in closely related species are more significant when assessing conservation compared to those in distantly related species	UniProt SwissProt/TrEMBL and NCBI Taxonomy	https://gsponerlab.msl.ubc.ca/software/list/	
FAST-SNP	A web server that allows users to efficiently identify and prioritize high-risk SNPs according to their phenotypic risks and putative functional effects	NCBI dbSNP, Ensembl, TFSearch, PolyPhen, ESEfinder, RescueESE, FAS-ESS, SwissProt, UCSC Golden Path, NCBI Blast and HapMap	http://fastsnp.ibms.sinica.edu.tw/	
PANTHER	PANTHER relate protein sequence evolution to the evolution of specific protein functions and biological roles. The source of protein sequences used to build the protein family trees and used a computer-assisted manual curation step to better define the protein family clusters	STKE, KEGG, MetaCyc, FREX and Reactome	http://www.pantherdb.org/	
Meta-SNP	SVM-based meta predictor including 4 different methods.	PhD-SNP, PANTHER, SIFT, SNAP	http://snps.biofold.org/meta-snp	
PopViz	Integrative and interactive gene-centric visualization of population genetics and mutation damage prediction scores of human gene variants	gnomAD, Ensembl, UniProt, OMIM, UCSC, CADD, EIGEN, LINSIGHT, SIFT, PolyPhen-2,		

== Algorithms used in annotation tools ==
Variant annotation tools use machine learning algorithms to predict variant annotations. Different annotation tools use different algorithms. Common algorithms include:

- Interval/Random forest-eg.MutPred, SNPeff
- Neural networks-eg.SNAP
- Support Vector Machines-e.g. PhD-SNP, SNPs&GO
- Bayesian classification-eg.PolyPhen-2

== Comparison of variant annotation tools ==
A large number of variant annotation tools are available for variant annotation. The annotation by different tools does not always agree amongst each other, as the defined rules for data handling differ between applications. It is frankly impossible to perform a perfect comparison of the available tools. Not all tools have the same input and output nor the same functionality. Below is a table of major annotation tools and their functional area.

Tools	Input file	Output file	SNP	INDEL	CNV	WEB or Program	Source
AnnoVar	VCF, pileup, CompleteGenomics, GFF3-SOLiD, SOAPsnp, MAQ, CASAVA	TXT	Yes	Yes	Yes	Program	
Jannovar	VCF	VCF	Yes	Yes	Yes	Java Program	
SNPeff	VCF, pileup/TXT	VCF, TXT, HTML	Yes	Yes	No	Program	
Ensembl VEP	Ensembl default (coordinates), VCF, variant identifiers, HGVS, SPDI, REST-style regions	VCF, VEP, TXT, JSON	Yes	Yes	Yes	Web, Perl script, REST API	
AnnTools	VCF, pileup, TXT	VCF	Yes	Yes	No	No	
SeattleSeq	VVCF, MAQ, CASAVA, GATK BED	VCF, SeattleSeq	Yes	Yes	No	Web	
VARIANT	VCF, GFF2, BED	web report, TXT	Yes	Yes	Yes	Web	

== Application ==
Different annotations capture diverse aspects of variant function. Simultaneous use of multiple, varied functional annotations could improve rare variants association analysis power of whole exome and whole genome sequencing studies. Some tools have been developed to enable functionally-informed phenotype-genotype association analysis for common and rare variants by incorporating functional annotations in biobank-scale cohorts.

== Conclusions ==
The next generation of SNP annotation webservers can take advantage of the growing amount of data in core bioinformatics resources and use intelligent agents to fetch data from different sources as needed. From a user's point of view, it is more efficient to submit a set of SNPs and receive results in a single step, which makes meta-servers the most attractive choice. However, if SNP annotation tools deliver heterogeneous data covering sequence, structure, regulation, pathways, etc., they must also provide frameworks for integrating data into a decision algorithms, and quantitative confidence measures so users can assess which data are relevant and which are not.
