= MAFB =

MAFB can refer to:

- MAFB, a human gene that encodes the MafB transcription factor
- March Joint Air Reserve Base (March Air Force Base)
- Maxwell Air Force Base in Montgomery, Alabama
- Minot Air Force Base in Minot, North Dakota
- Moody Air Force Base in Valdosta, Georgia
