= WGAViewer =

WGAViewer is a bioinformatics software tool which is designed to visualize, annotate, and help interpret the results generated from a genome wide association study (GWAS). Alongside the P values of association, WGAViewer allows a researcher to visualize and consider other supporting evidence, such as the genomic context of the SNP, linkage disequilibrium (LD) with ungenotyped SNPs, gene expression database, and the evidence from other GWAS projects, when determining the potential importance of an individual SNP.

== Introduction ==
=== Functions ===
WGAViewer currently offers several classes of annotation of the GWAS results:

(1) Overview of WGA results allowing

- zooming in/out
- searching for gene/SNP
- top hits sorting with individual SNP annotation

(2) Genic annotation of WGA results with explicit reference to:

- align results with the latest genome build
- gene/transcripts context
- linkage disequilibrium context

(3) Annotation for SNPs :

- LD score for all HapMap SNPs in specified region
- association with specified gene expression
- SNP function information

(4) Gene/SNP finding : locating and annotating specific genes, SNPs, or LD proxies for SNPs, and aligning the results with the latest genome build.

(5) Evidence from multiple scans.

(6) Supporting/QC databases: displaying supporting information, for example, HWE P values, effect size, effect direction, QC scores, or other user-customized data.

=== Language ===
WGAViewer is developed on the Java platform.

=== Authors ===
WGAViewer is developed and maintained by Dr. Dongliang Ge and Dr. David B. Goldstein at Duke University, Institute for Genome Sciences & Policy, Center for Human Genome Variation.

== Applications ==
A number of GWAS projects used the WGAViewer software tool.

One of these projects leads to the identification of the genetic variant predicting the hepatitis C treatment-induced viral clearance. The finding from that project, originally reported in Nature, showed that genotype 1 hepatitis C patients carrying certain genetic variant alleles near the IL28B gene are more possibly to achieve sustained virological response after the treatment of Pegylated interferon-alpha-2a or Pegylated interferon-alpha-2b (brand names Pegasys or PEG-Intron) combined with ribavirin. A later report from Nature demonstrated that the same genetic variants are also associated with the natural clearance of the genotype 1 hepatitis C virus.
