= Manhattan plot =

Method to display data used in genetic analysis

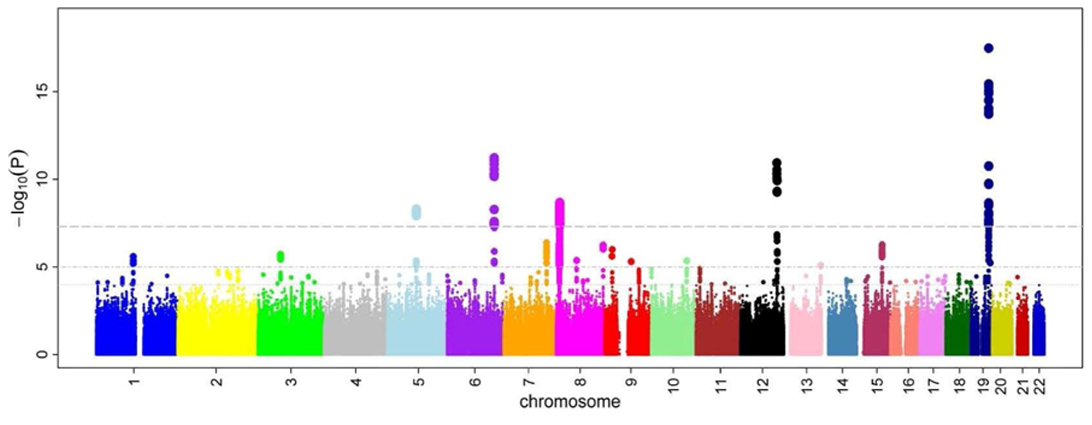
An illustration of a Manhattan plot depicting several strongly associated risk loci

A Manhattan plot is a type of plot, usually used to display data with a large number of data-points, many of non-zero amplitude, and with a distribution of higher-magnitude values. The plot is commonly used in genome-wide association studies (GWAS) to display significant SNPs.

It gains its name from the similarity of such a plot to the Manhattan skyline: a profile of skyscrapers towering above the lower level "buildings" which vary around a lower height.

== GWAS ==
In GWAS Manhattan plots, genomic coordinates are displayed along the x-axis, with the negative logarithm of the association p-value for each single nucleotide polymorphism (SNP) displayed on the y-axis, meaning that each dot on the Manhattan plot signifies an SNP. Because the strongest associations have the smallest p-values (e.g., 10^{−15}), their negative logarithms will be the greatest (e.g., 15). The different colors of each block usually show the extent of each chromosome.
