= MAFB (gene) =

Protein-coding gene in the species Homo sapiens

Identifiers
- Aliases: MAFB, KRML, MCTO, MAF bZIP transcription factor B, DURS3
- External IDs: OMIM: 608968; MGI: 104555; GeneCards: MAFB
Available structures
| PDB | Ortholog search: PDBe RCSB |
| PDB | List of PDB id codes 2WT7, 2WTY, 4AUW |

Gene location (Human)
| Chr. | Chromosome 20 (human) |
| Band | 20q12 | Start | 40,685,848 bp |
| Band | 20q12 | End | 40,689,236 bp |

Gene location (Mouse)
| Chr. | Chromosome 2 (mouse) |
| Band | 2 H2|2 80.92 cM | Start | 160,205,623 bp |
| Band | 2 H2|2 80.92 cM | End | 160,208,985 bp |
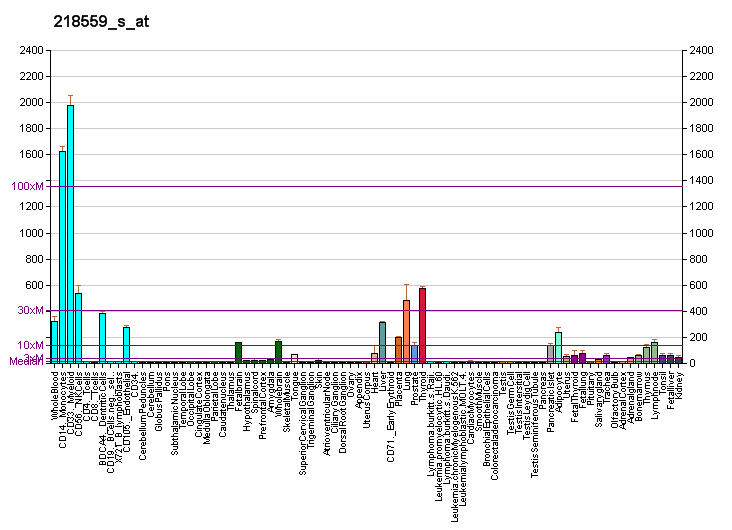
RNA expression pattern
| Bgee | Human / Mouse (ortholog); Top expressed in: glomerulus; skin of hip; gums; metanephric glomerulus; gingival epithelium; synovial membrane; human penis; synovial joint; nipple; skin of arm / Top expressed in: molar; stroma of bone marrow; temporal muscle; glomerulus; sternocleidomastoid muscle; lip; skin of external ear; digastric muscle; left lobe of liver; muscle of thigh; More reference expression data |
| BioGPS | More reference expression data |
Gene ontology
| Molecular function | DNA binding; DNA-binding transcription factor activity; DNA-binding transcription activator activity, RNA polymerase II-specific; transcription factor binding; RNA polymerase II cis-regulatory region sequence-specific DNA binding; protein binding; protein homodimerization activity; protein heterodimerization activity; sequence-specific double-stranded DNA binding; DNA-binding transcription factor activity, RNA polymerase II-specific; sequence-specific DNA binding |
| Cellular component | transcription regulator complex; nucleus |
| Biological process | T cell differentiation in thymus; negative regulation of osteoclast differentiation; brain segmentation; thymus development; transcription by RNA polymerase II; respiratory gaseous exchange by respiratory system; segment specification; negative regulation of erythrocyte differentiation; nervous system development; transcription, DNA-templated; rhombomere 6 development; rhombomere 5 development; inner ear morphogenesis; sensory organ development; positive regulation of transcription by RNA polymerase II; regulation of transcription, DNA-templated; abducens nerve formation; regulation of transcription by RNA polymerase II |
Sources:Amigo / QuickGO
Orthologs
| Databases | NCBI: entry; OMA: entry |
| Species | Human | Mouse |
| Entrez | 9935 | 16658 |
| Ensembl | ENSG00000204103 | ENSMUSG00000074622 |
| UniProt | Q9Y5Q3 | P54841 |
| RefSeq (mRNA) | NM_005461 | NM_010658 |
| RefSeq (protein) | NP_005452 | NP_034788 |
| Location (UCSC) | Chr 20: 40.69 – 40.69 Mb | Chr 2: 160.21 – 160.21 Mb |
| PubMed search |
- Wikidata
| View/Edit Human | View/Edit Mouse |

Transcription factor MafB also known as V-maf musculoaponeurotic fibrosarcoma oncogene homolog B is a protein that in humans is encoded by the MAFB gene. This gene maps to chromosome 20q11.2-q13.1, consists of a single exon and spans around 3 kb.

== Function ==
MafB is a basic leucine zipper (bZIP) transcription factor that plays an important role in the regulation of lineage-specific hematopoiesis. The encoded nuclear protein represses ETS1-mediated transcription of erythroid-specific genes in myeloid cells.

== Clinical significance ==
Mutations in the murine Mafb gene are responsible for the mutant mouse Kreisler (kr) that presents an abnormal segmentation of the hindbrain and exhibit hyperactive behavior, including head tossing and running in circles. This mice dies at birth due to renal failure whereas the Mafb -/- mice dies of central apnea.

Recently, single-nucleotide polymorphisms (SNPs) near MAFB have been found associated with nonsyndromic cleft lip and palate. The GENEVA Cleft Consortium study, a genomewide association study involving 1,908 case-parent trios from Europe, the United States, China, Taiwan, Singapore, Korea, and the Philippines, first identified MAFB as being associated with cleft lip and/or palate with stronger genome-wide significance in Asian than European populations. The difference in populations could reflect variable coverage by available markers or true allelic heterogeneity. In mouse models, Mafb mRNA and protein were detected in both craniofacial ectoderm and neural crest-derived mesoderm between embryonic days 13.5 and 14.5; expression was strong in the epithelium around the palatal shelves and in the medial edge epithelium during palatal fusion. After fusion, Mafb expression was stronger in oral epithelium compared to mesenchymal tissue. In addition, sequencing analysis detected a new missense mutation in the Filipino population, H131Q, that was significantly more frequent in cases than in matched controls. The gene-poor regions either side of the MAFB gene include numerous binding sites for transcription factors that are known to have a role in palate development.
