= Marjolein Kriek =

Dutch biologist and geneticist

Marjolein Kriek (born 22 November 1973) is a Dutch clinical geneticist at the Leiden University Medical Center. In 2008, at age 34, she became the first woman and probably the first European to have her total DNA genome sequenced.

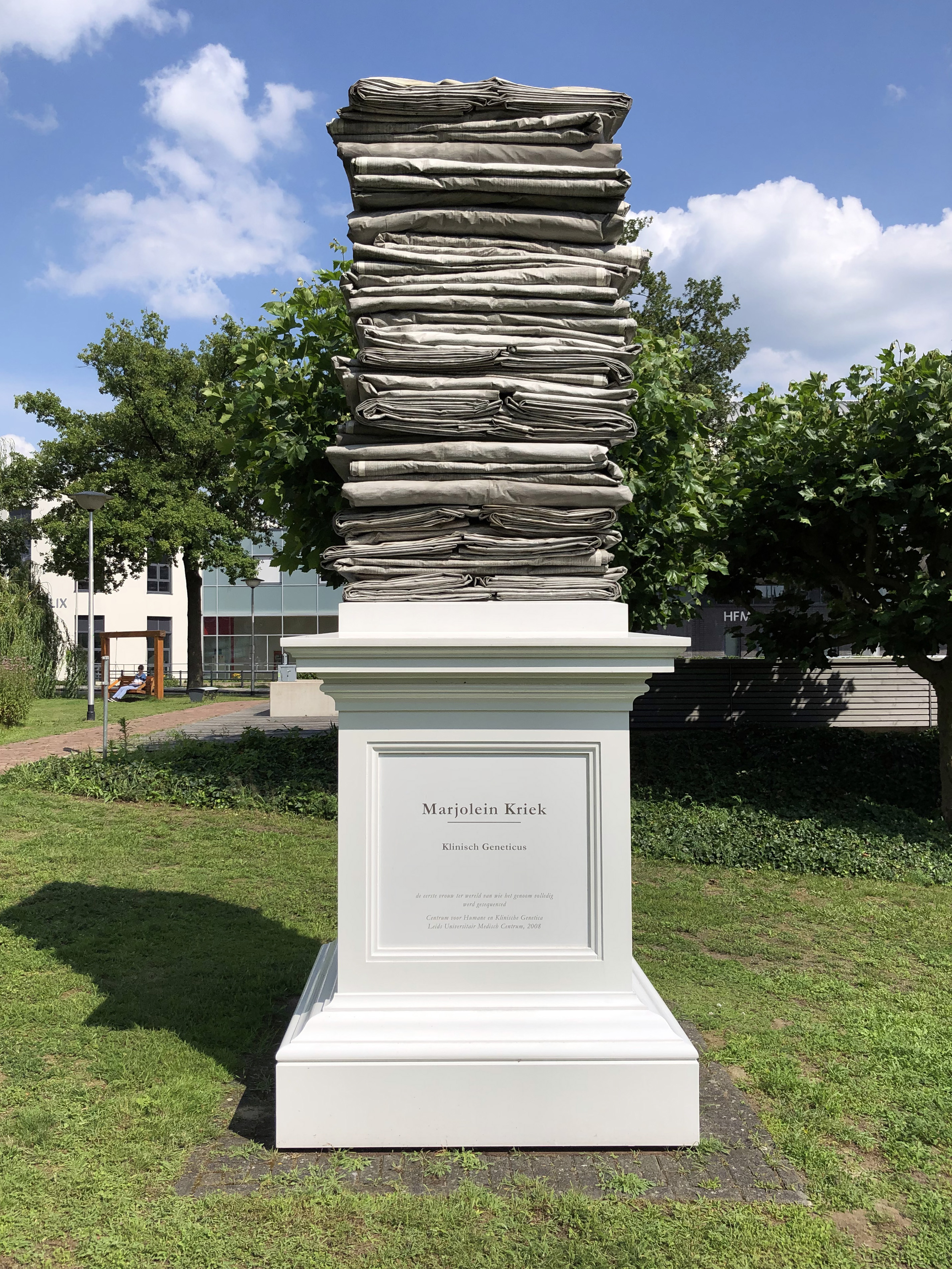
Statue for Marjolein Kriek, Nijmegen, the Netherlands. Detail of the computer print:

== Sequencing project ==
Leiden University announced the completion of the nine-month-long sequencing of Kriek's genome on 26 May 2008, though the results of the study were published later. The study was initiated by Gert-Jan van Ommen of the LUMC team and director of the Center for Medical Systems Biology (CMSB), to gain insight in X-chromosome variability. The data set contained significant redundancy, as each base pair was sampled an average of seven to eight times. The sequencing has been performed in close collaboration with a spin-off company, 'ServiceXS'.

At the time, Kriek was one of five or six people to have their entire genome sequenced, the others being James D. Watson, Craig Venter, two Yoruba men and possibly Dan Stoicescu of Switzerland.

== Career and research interests ==
Kriek was born in Leiden and obtained her doctorate in Biomedical Science at Leiden University in 2002. Her graduate studies included mutation screening in intellectually disabled people. Kriek's subsequent research interests similarly focussed on the diagnosis and clinical significance of genomic imbalances and micro rearrangements as the causes of developmental delay, intellectual disability and congenital syndromes.

== See also ==
- Frederic Sanger, inventor of sequencing
- Knome, commercial whole genome sequencing
