= MutationTaster =

Free web-based application to evaluate DNA variants for their disease-causing potential

Content
- Description: In silico tool to predict the disease-causing potential of DNA variants

Contact
- Research center: Charité Berlin
- Authors: Jana Marie Schwarz and Dominik Seelow
- Primary citation: PMID 24681721

Access
- Website: www.mutationtaster.org

MutationTaster is a free web-based application to evaluate DNA sequence variants for their disease-causing potential. The software performs a battery of in silico tests to estimate the impact of the variant on the gene product / protein. Tests are made on both, protein and DNA level, MutationTaster is hence not limited to substitutions of single amino acids but can also handle synonymous or intronic variants.

== Background ==
Many genetic disorders can be caused by mutation of a single gene. New sequencing techniques however, have shown that a single individual can have up to 3.5 million alterations in the whole genome, most of which do not have a detrimental health effect. The challenge of prediction tools is thus to filter harmless mutations from disease-causing ones. These tools are not designed to predict sources of complex diseases such as cancer. The latter usually do not have a monogenic causation but are caused by multiple gene defects that develop cumulatively into a disease.

== Approach and tests ==
Mutation Taster is written in Perl and can process Next-generation sequencing data of all major platforms (Roche 454, Illumina Genome Analyzer and ABI SOLiD). The program first discards mutations that are known, harmless polymorphisms by comparison with the integrated databases. The remaining SNPs (Single-nucleotide polymorphism) are tested according to the gene alteration they are causing:

- Silent synonymous or intronic alterations that do not lead to an amino acid exchange
- Mutations that affect a single amino acid
- Mutations causing complex changes in the amino acid sequence (such as indels)

Multiple tests are performed to determine the nature of the given SNP. These tests comprise (among others):

- amino acid substitution(s)
- conservation of affected amino acid(s)
- potential loss of functional protein domains
- length of protein
- effect on splicing
- conservation on DNA level (phastCons / phyloP)
- potential abrogation of regulatory elements (such as transcription factor binding sites)

Integrated data sources (among others):

- Ensembl
- UniProt
- ClinVar
- ExAC
- 1000 Genomes Project
- phyloP
- phastCons

The single results are then assessed by a Naive Bayes classifier which decides whether or not their combined effect might be deleterious for the protein. The 'raw' accuracy of MutationTaster is about 90%, with the inclusion of knowledge about common (harmless) polymorphisms and known disease mutations, the actual rate of correct classifications is much higher. The test output explains if the alteration is a known or predicted harmless or disease-causing mutation and gives detailed information about the mutation.

Importantly, the predictions of clinical effects of mutations suffer from a lack of specificity, which appears to be the common constraint of all recently used prediction methods, including those named above. Despite that, predictions mediated by these methods are associated with nearly absolute sensitivity. The outcomes of prediction methods are often uncritically used, particularly by non-specialists in the field.

== Development ==
Development of MutationTaster has started in 2007, the software is available online since 2009. MutationTaster is hosted at the Charité Berlin and its current developers are Olivia Ebner, Daniela Hombach, Markus Schülke, Jana Marie Schwarz, Dominik Seelow. Current efforts are focused on integrating mutations that do not directly alter protein coding genes but have an effect on gene regulation and expression.
