= Common disease-common variant =

Hypothesis for alleles

The common disease-common variant (often abbreviated CD-CV) hypothesis predicts that common disease-causing alleles, or variants, will be found in all human populations which manifest a given disease. Common variants (not necessarily disease-causing) are known to exist in coding and regulatory sequences of genes. According to the CD-CV hypothesis, some of those variants lead to susceptibility to complex polygenic diseases. Each variant at each gene influencing a complex disease will have a small additive or multiplicative effect on the disease phenotype. These diseases, or traits, are evolutionarily neutral in part because so many genes influence the traits. The hypothesis has held in the case of putative causal variants in apolipoprotein E, including APOE ε4, associated with Alzheimer's disease. IL23R has been found to be associated with Crohn's disease; the at-risk allele has a frequency of 93% in the general population.

One common form of variation across human genomes is called a single nucleotide polymorphism (SNP). As indicated by the name, SNPs are single base changes in the DNA. SNP variants tend to be common in different human populations. These polymorphisms have been valuable as genomic signposts, or "markers", in the search for common variants that influence susceptibility to common diseases. Research has linked common SNPs to diseases such as type 2 diabetes, Alzheimer's, schizophrenia and hypertension.

== See also ==
- Rare functional variant
