= Genome-wide significance =

Statistical significance threshold for genetic associations

In genome-wide association studies, genome-wide significance (sometimes abbreviated GWS) is a specific threshold for determining the statistical significance of a reported association between a given single-nucleotide polymorphism (SNP) and a given trait. The most commonly accepted threshold is p < 5 × 10^{−8}, which is based on performing a Bonferroni correction for all the independent common SNPs across the human genome. If a p-value is found to be lower than this threshold in a genome-wide association study, the null hypothesis of no true SNP-association will typically be rejected. However, there has been some criticism of this threshold, with a 2012 study suggesting that a significant number of associations with p-values just above this threshold are genuine, replicable associations. The authors of this study concluded that their finding "...suggests a possible relaxation in the current GWS threshold." More recently, it has been suggested that the conventional threshold should be modified to take into account the increasing prevalence of low-frequency genetic variants in genome-wide association studies.
