= Eric R. Gamazon =

Filipino-American statistical geneticist

- Born: Eric Ramos Gamazon
- Education: University of Chicago; University of Amsterdam (PhD)
- Awards: National Institutes of Health Genomic Innovator Award (2019)
- Scientific career
- Fields: Statistical genetics Functional genomics Human genetics
- Workplaces: University of Chicago; University of Cambridge; Vanderbilt University Medical Center
- Thesis: The genetic architecture of neuropsychiatric traits : mechanism, polygenicity, and genome function

Eric R. Gamazon is a statistical geneticist in Vanderbilt University, with faculty affiliations in the Division of Genetic Medicine, Data Science Institute, and Center for Precision Medicine. He is a Life Member of Clare Hall, Cambridge University after election to a Visiting Fellowship (2018).

== Research and career ==
Eric Gamazon has developed computational methods that can be used to identify genes and mechanisms underlying complex diseases. He was a developer of the transcriptome-wide association study (TWAS) methodology (PrediXcan), which integrates gene expression and genome-wide association study data to identify disease-associated genes. Subsequent work integrated Mendelian randomization into TWAS. As of December 2021, he has authored 160 peer-reviewed publications in human genetics, functional genomics, and statistical genetics. He was a co-chair of the Genome-Wide Association Studies Working Group of the Genotype-Tissue Expression (GTEx) project, the National Institutes of Health (NIH) program that developed a transcriptome and expression quantitative trait loci (eQTL) reference resource for the scientific community. He leads a research initiative to integrate large-scale DNA biobanks and functional genomics to further precision medicine in diverse populations.

He has identified genes associated with neuropsychiatric disorders. He leads a National Institute on Aging funded international consortium that aims to identify new treatments for Alzheimer's disease using genetic and molecular data.

=== Awards and honors ===
Gamazon was a recipient of the inaugural National Institutes of Health Genomic Innovator Award, which is awarded to investigators in genome biology and genomic medicine with "outstanding records of productivity as they pursue important research areas, including new directions as they arise." He was elected a Fellow of the Royal Society of Biology and a Fellow of Clare Hall, Cambridge in 2018. In 2021, he was appointed a standing member of the National Institutes of Health Review Panel for Biostatistical Methods and Research Design (BMRD), which reviews and makes recommendations on (grant) "applications which seek to advance statistical and mathematical techniques and technologies applicable to the experimental design and analysis of data in biomedical, behavioral, and social science research."

== Selected publications ==
- Smemo, Scott, Juan J. Tena, Kyoung-Han Kim, Eric R. Gamazon, Noboru J. Sakabe, Carlos Gómez-Marín, Ivy Aneas et al. "Obesity-associated variants within FTO form long-range functional connections with IRX3." Nature 507, no. 7492 (2014): 371–375. doi:10.1038/nature13138.
- Gamazon, Eric R., Heather E. Wheeler, Kaanan P. Shah, Sahar V. Mozaffari, Keston Aquino-Michaels, Robert J. Carroll, Anne E. Eyler et al. "A gene-based association method for mapping traits using reference transcriptome data." Nature Genetics 47, no. 9 (2015): 1091–1098. doi:10.1038/ng.3367.
- Gamazon, Eric R., Ayellet V. Segrè, Martijn van de Bunt, Xiaoquan Wen, Hualin S. Xi, Farhad Hormozdiari, Halit Ongen et al. "Using an atlas of gene regulation across 44 human tissues to inform complex disease-and trait-associated variation." Nature Genetics 50, no. 7 (2018): 956–967. doi:10.1038/s41588-018-0154-4.
- Gamazon, Eric R., Aeilko H. Zwinderman, Nancy J. Cox, Damiaan Denys, and Eske M. Derks. "Multi-tissue transcriptome analyses identify genetic mechanisms underlying neuropsychiatric traits." Nature Genetics 51, no. 6 (2019): 933–940. doi:10.1038/s41588-019-0409-8.
- Wang, Ying, Frederick S. Yen, Xiphias Ge Zhu, Rebecca C. Timson, Ross Weber, Changrui Xing, Yuyang Liu, Benjamin Allwein, Hanzhi Luo, Hsi-Wen Yeh, Søren Heissel, Gokhan Unlu, Eric R. Gamazon, Michael G. Kharas, Richard Hite & Kıvanç Birsoy. "SLC25A39 is necessary for mitochondrial glutathione import in mammalian cells." Nature 599, no. 7883 (2021): 136–140. doi:10.1038/s41586-021-04025-w.
- Pietzner, Maik, Eleanor Wheeler, Julia Carrasco-Zanini, Adrian Cortes, Mine Koprulu, Maria A. Wörheide, Erin Oerton, James Cook, Isobel D. Stewart, Nicola D. Kerrison, Jian'an Luan, Johannes Raffler, Matthias Arnold, Wiebke Arlt, Stephen O'Rahilly, Gabi Kastenmüller, Eric R. Gamazon, Aroon D. Hingorani, Robert A. Scott, Nicholas J. Wareham, Claudia Langenberg. "Mapping the proteo-genomic convergence of human diseases." Science 374, no. 6569 (2021): eabj1541. doi:10.1126/science.abj1541.
- Zhou, Dan, Yi Jiang, Xue Zhong, Nancy J. Cox, Chunyu Liu, and Eric R. Gamazon. "A unified framework for joint-tissue transcriptome-wide association and Mendelian randomization analysis." Nature Genetics 52, no. 11 (2020): 1239–1246. doi:10.1038/s41588-020-0706-2.
