= Cleaved amplified polymorphic sequence =

The cleaved amplified polymorphic sequence (CAPS) method is a technique in molecular biology for the analysis of genetic markers. It is an extension to the restriction fragment length polymorphism (RFLP) method, using polymerase chain reaction (PCR) to more quickly analyse the results.

Like RFLP, CAPS works on the principle that genetic differences between individuals can create or abolish restriction endonuclease restriction sites, and that these differences can be detected in the resulting DNA fragment length after digestion.

In the CAPS method, PCR amplification is directed across the altered restriction site, and the products digested with the restriction enzyme. When fractionated by agarose or polyacrylamide gel electrophoresis, the digested PCR products will give readily distinguishable patterns of bands. Alternatively, the amplified segment can be analyzed by allele-specific oligonucleotide (ASO) probes, a process that can often be done by a simple dot blot.

== Advantages ==
CAPS markers are co-dominant genetic markers, meaning they produce different digestion patterns for individuals that are homozygous or heterozygous for a particular allele. The derived CAPS (dCAPS) variant allows for the detection of single nucleotide polymorphisms (SNPs) that do not naturally create or destroy a restriction site by using a mismatched PCR primer to engineer a polymorphism.

== Applications ==
In plant genetics and breeding, CAPS markers are used for gene mapping and marker-assisted selection, and have also been used in genetic diversity and population structure analyses. A 2024 review describes CAPS markers as important in horticultural crops for QTL delimitation and for identifying loci linked to disease resistance, yield, and quality traits.

== See also ==
- RFLP
