= History of polymerase chain reaction =

(This article assumes familiarity with the terms and components used in the PCR process.)

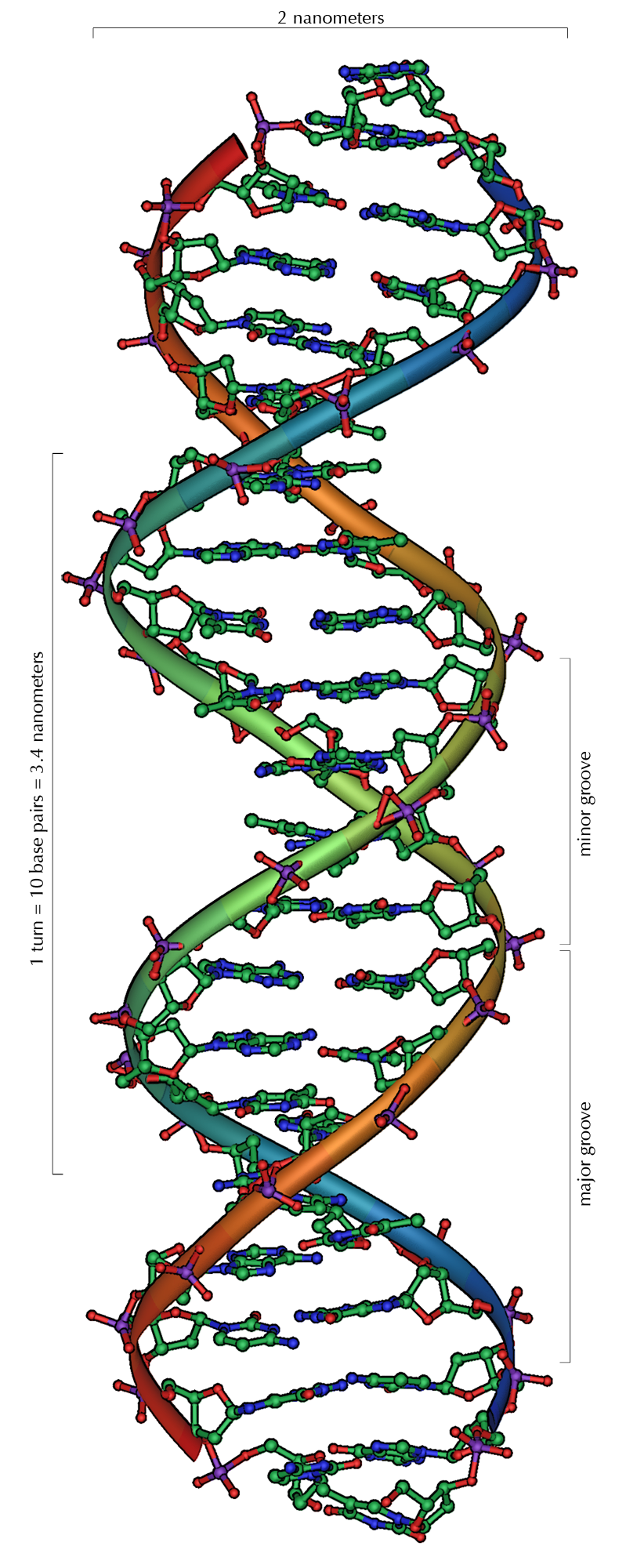
Structure of DNA

DNA replication

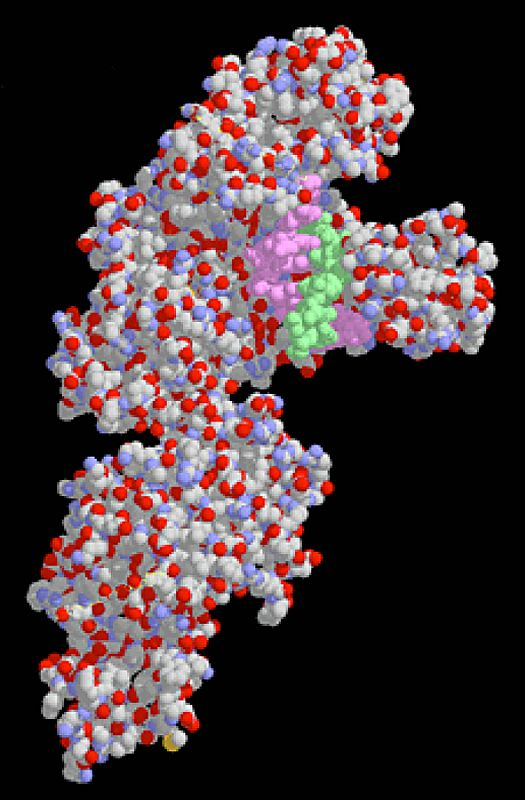
DNA Polymerase I (PDB)

Molecular mechanism of PCR

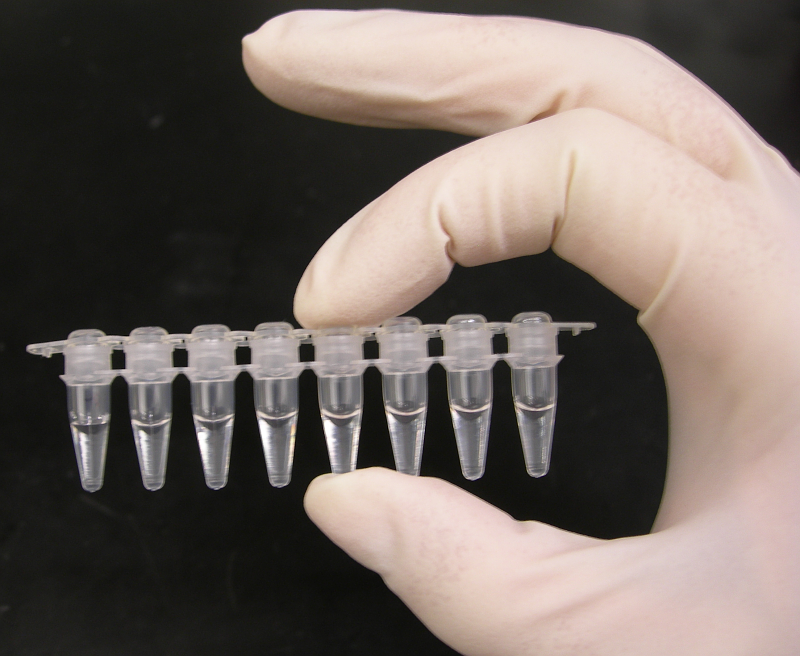
A strip of eight PCR tubes

The history of the polymerase chain reaction (PCR) has variously been described as a classic "Eureka!" moment, or as an example of cooperative teamwork between disparate researchers. Following is a list of events before, during, and after its development:

== Prelude ==
- On April 25, 1953 James D. Watson and Francis Crick published "a radically different structure" for DNA, thereby founding the field of molecular genetics. Their structural model featured two strands of complementary base-paired DNA, running in opposite directions as a double helix. They concluded their report saying that "It has not escaped our notice that the specific pairing we have postulated immediately suggests a possible copying mechanism for the genetic material". For this insight they were awarded the Nobel Prize in 1962.
- Starting in the mid-1950s, Arthur Kornberg began to study the mechanism of DNA replication. By 1957 he has identified the first DNA polymerase. The enzyme was limited, creating DNA in just one direction and requiring an existing primer to initiate copying of the template strand. Overall, the DNA replication process is surprisingly complex, requiring separate proteins to open the DNA helix, to keep it open, to create primers, to synthesize new DNA, to remove the primers, and to tie the pieces all together. Kornberg was awarded the Nobel Prize in 1959.
- In the early 1960s H. Gobind Khorana made significant advances in the elucidation of the genetic code. Afterwards, he initiated a large project to totally synthesize a functional human gene. To achieve this, Khorana pioneered many of the techniques needed to make and use synthetic DNA oligonucleotides. Sequence-specific oligonucleotides were used both as building blocks for the gene, and as primers and templates for DNA polymerase. In 1968 Khorana was awarded the Nobel Prize for his work on the Genetic Code.
- In 1969 Thomas D. Brock reported the isolation of a new species of bacterium from a hot spring in Yellowstone National Park. Thermus aquaticus (Taq) became a standard source of enzymes able to withstand higher temperatures than those from E. coli.
- In 1970 Klenow reported a modified version of DNA Polymerase I from E. coli. Treatment with a protease removed the 'forward' nuclease activity of this enzyme. The overall activity of the resulting Klenow fragment is therefore biased towards the synthesis of DNA, rather than its degradation.
- By 1971 researchers in Khorana's project, concerned over their yields of DNA, began looking at "repair synthesis" – an artificial system of primers and templates that allows DNA polymerase to copy segments of the gene they are synthesizing. Although similar to PCR in using repeated applications of DNA polymerase, the process they usually describe employs just a single primer-template complex, and therefore would not lead to the exponential amplification seen in PCR.
- Circa 1971 Kjell Kleppe, a researcher in Khorana's lab, envisioned a process very similar to PCR. At the end of a paper on the earlier technique, he described how a two-primer system might lead to replication of a specific segment of DNA:

one would hope to obtain two structures, each containing the full length of the template strand appropriately complexed with the primer. DNA polymerase will be added to complete the process of repair replication. Two molecules of the original duplex should result. The whole cycle could be repeated, there being added every time a fresh dose of the enzyme.

No results are shown there, and the mention of unpublished experiments in another paper may (or may not) refer to the two-primer replication system. (These early precursors to PCR were carefully scrutinized in a patent lawsuit, and are discussed in Mullis' chapters in The Polymerase Chain Reaction (1994).)

- Also in 1971, Cetus Corporation was founded in Berkeley, California, by Ronald Cape, Peter Farley, and Donald Glaser. Initially the company screened for microorganisms capable of producing components used in the manufacture of food, chemicals, vaccines, or pharmaceuticals. After moving to nearby Emeryville, they began projects involving the new biotechnology industry, primarily the cloning and expression of human genes, but also the development of diagnostic tests for genetic mutations.
- In 1976 a DNA polymerase was isolated from T. aquaticus. It was found to retain its activity at temperatures above 75 °C.
- In 1977 Frederick Sanger reported a method for determining the sequence of DNA. The technique employed an oligonucleotide primer, DNA polymerase, and modified nucleotide precursors that block further extension of the primer in sequence-dependent manner. For this innovation he was awarded the Nobel Prize in 1980.

By 1980 all of the components needed to perform PCR amplification were known to the scientific community. The use of DNA polymerase to extend oligonucleotide primers was a common procedure in DNA sequencing and the production of cDNA for cloning and expression. The use of DNA polymerase for nick translation was the most common method used to label DNA probes for Southern blotting.

== Theme ==
- In 1979 Cetus Corporation hired Kary Mullis to synthesize oligonucleotides for various research and development projects throughout the company. These oligos were used as probes for screening cloned genes, as primers for DNA sequencing and cDNA synthesis, and as building blocks for gene construction. Originally synthesizing these oligos by hand, Mullis later evaluated early prototypes for automated synthesizers.
- By May 1983 Mullis synthesized oligonucleotide probes for a project at Cetus to analyze a sickle cell anemia mutation. Hearing of problems with their work, Mullis proposed an alternative technique based on Sanger's DNA sequencing method. Realizing the difficulty in making the Sanger method specific to a single location in the genome, Mullis then modified the idea to add a second primer on the opposite strand. Repeated applications of polymerase could lead to a chain reaction of replication for a specific segment of the genome – PCR.
- Later in 1983 Mullis began to test his idea. His first experiment did not involve thermal cycling – he hoped that the polymerase could perform continued replication on its own. Later experiments that year included repeated thermal cycling, and targeted small segments of a cloned gene. Mullis considered these experiments a success, but could not convince other researchers.
- In June 1984 Cetus held its annual meeting in Monterey, California. Its scientists and consultants presented their results, and considered future projects. Mullis presented a poster on the production of oligonucleotides by his laboratory, and presented some of the results from his experiments with PCR. Only Joshua Lederberg, a Cetus consultant, showed any interest. Later at the meeting, Mullis was involved in a physical altercation with another Cetus researcher over a dispute unrelated to PCR. The other scientist left the company, and Mullis was removed as head of the oligo synthesis lab.

== Development ==
- In September 1984 Tom White, VP of Research at Cetus (and a close friend), pressured Mullis to take his idea to the group developing the genetic mutation assay. Together, they spent the following months designing experiments that could convincingly show that PCR is working on genomic DNA. Unfortunately, the expected amplification product was not visible in agarose gel electrophoresis, leading to confusion as to whether the reaction was specific to the targeted region.
- In November 1984 the amplification products were analyzed by Southern blotting, which clearly demonstrated increasing amounts of the expected 110 bp DNA product. Having the first visible signal, the researchers began optimizing the process. Later, the amplified products were cloned and sequenced, showing that most of the amplified DNA was the desired target, and that the Klenow fragment then being used only rarely incorporated incorrect nucleotides during replication.

== Exposition ==
Following normal industrial practice, Mullis applied for a patent covering the basic idea of PCR and many potential applications, and was asked by the PTO to include more results. On March 28, 1985, Mullis' development group filed an application focused on the analysis of the sickle cell anemia mutation via PCR and Oligomer restriction. After modification, both patents were approved on July 28, 1987.

In the spring of 1985 the development group began to apply the PCR technique to other targets. Primers and probes were designed for a variable segment of the Human leukocyte antigen DQα gene. This reaction was much more specific than that for the β-hemoglobin target – the expected PCR product is directly visible on agarose gel electrophoresis. The amplification products from various sources were also cloned and sequenced, the first determination of new alleles by PCR. At the same time the original Oligomer Restriction assay technique was replaced with the more general Allele specific oligonucleotide method.

Also early in 1985, the group began using a thermostable DNA polymerase (the enzyme used in the original reaction is destroyed at each heating step). At the time only two had been described, from Taq and Bst. The report on Taq polymerase was more detailed, so it was chosen for testing. The Bst polymerase was later found to be unsuitable for PCR. That summer Mullis attempted to isolate the enzyme, and a group outside of Cetus was contracted to make it, all without success. In the Fall of 1985 Susanne Stoffel and David Gelfand at Cetus succeed in making the polymerase, and it was immediately found by Randy Saiki to support the PCR process.

With patents submitted, work proceeded to report PCR to the general scientific community. An abstract for an American Society of Human Genetics meeting in Salt Lake City was submitted in April 1985, and the first announcement of PCR was made there by Saiki in October. Two publications were planned – an 'idea' paper from Mullis, and an 'application' paper from the entire development group. Mullis submitted his manuscript to the journal Nature, which rejected it for not including results. The other paper, mainly describing the OR analysis assay, was submitted to Science on September 20, 1985, and was accepted in November. After the rejection of Mullis' report in December, details on the PCR process were hastily added to the second paper, which appears on December 20, 1985.

In May 1986 Mullis presented PCR at the Cold Spring Harbor Symposium, and published a modified version of his original 'idea' manuscript much later. The first non-Cetus report using PCR was submitted on September 5, 1986, indicating how quickly other laboratories began implementing the technique. The Cetus development group published their detailed sequence analysis of PCR products on September 8, 1986, and their use of ASO probes on November 13, 1986.

The use of Taq polymerase in PCR was announced by Henry Erlich at a meeting in Berlin on September 20, 1986, submitted for publication in October 1987, and was published early the next year'. The patent for PCR with Taq polymerase was filed on June 17, 1987, and was issued on October 23, 1990.

== Variation ==
In December 1985, a joint venture between Cetus and Perkin-Elmer was established to develop instruments and reagents for PCR. Complex thermal cyclers were constructed to perform the Klenow-based amplifications; however, they were never marketed. Simpler machines for Taq-based PCR were developed, and on November 19, 1987, a press release announced the commercial availability of the "PCR-1000 Thermal Cycler" and "AmpliTaq DNA Polymerase".

In the spring of 1985, John Sninsky at Cetus began to use PCR for the difficult task of measuring the amount of HIV circulating in blood. A viable test was announced on April 11, 1986, and published in May 1987. Donated blood could then be screened for the virus, and the effect of antiviral drugs directly monitored.

In 1985, Norm Arnheim, also a member of the development team, concluded his sabbatical at Cetus and assumed an academic position at University of Southern California. He began to investigate the use of PCR to amplify samples containing just a single copy of the target sequence. By 1989 his lab developed multiplex-PCR on single sperm to directly analyze the products of meiotic recombination. These single-copy amplifications, which had first been run during the characterization of Taq polymerase, became vital to the study of ancient DNA, as well as the genetic typing of preimplanted embryos.

In 1986, Edward Blake, a forensics scientist working in the Cetus building, collaborated with Henry Erlich, a researcher at Cetus, to apply PCR to the analysis of criminal evidence. A panel of DNA samples from old cases was collected and coded and was analyzed blind by Saiki using the HLA DQα assay. When the code was broken, all of the evidence and perpetrators matched. Blake and Erlich's group used the technique almost immediately in Pennsylvania v. Pestinikas, the first use of PCR in a criminal case. This DQα test was developed by Cetus as one of their "Ampli-Type" kits and became part of early protocols for the testing of forensic evidence, such as in the O. J. Simpson murder case.

By 1989, Alec Jeffreys, who had earlier developed and applied the first DNA Fingerprinting tests, used PCR to increase their sensitivity. With further modification, the amplification of highly polymorphic Variable number tandem repeat (VNTR) loci became the standard protocol for National DNA Databases such as Combined DNA Index System (CODIS).

In 1987, Russ Higuchi succeeded in amplifying DNA from a human hair. This work expanded to develop methods for the amplification of DNA from highly degraded samples, such as from ancient DNA and in forensic evidence.

== Coda ==
- On December 22, 1989, the journal Science awarded Taq Polymerase (and PCR) its first "Molecule of the Year". The 'Taq PCR' paper became for several years the most cited publication in biology.
- After the publication of the first PCR paper, the United States Government sent a stern letter to Randy Saiki, admonishing him for publishing a report on "chain reactions" without the required prior review and approval by the U.S. Department of Energy. Cetus responded, explaining the differences between PCR and the atomic bomb.
- On July 23, 1991, Cetus announced that its sale to the neighboring biotechnology company Chiron. As part of the sale, rights to the PCR patents were sold for US$300 million to Hoffman-La Roche (who in 1989 had bought limited rights to PCR). Many of the Cetus PCR researchers moved to the Roche subsidiary, Roche Molecular Systems.
- On October 13, 1993, Kary Mullis, who had left Cetus in 1986, was awarded the Nobel Prize in Chemistry. On the morning of his acceptance speech, he was nearly arrested by Swedish authorities for the "inappropriate use of a laser pointer".
