= Restriction fragment length polymorphism =

Molecular biology technique

In molecular biology, restriction fragment length polymorphism (RFLP) is a technique that exploits variations in homologous DNA sequences, known as polymorphisms, in order to distinguish individuals, populations, or species in order to pinpoint the locations of genes within a sequence. The term may refer to a polymorphism itself, as detected through the differing locations of restriction enzyme sites, or to a related laboratory technique by which such differences can be illustrated. In RFLP analysis, a DNA sample is digested into fragments by one or more restriction enzymes, and the resulting restriction fragments are then separated by gel electrophoresis according to their size.

RFLP analysis is now largely obsolete due to the emergence of inexpensive DNA sequencing technologies, but it was the first DNA profiling technique inexpensive enough to see widespread application. RFLP analysis was an important early tool in genome mapping, localization of genes for genetic disorders, determination of risk for disease, and paternity testing.

== RFLP analysis ==
The basic technique for the detection of RFLPs involves fragmenting a sample of DNA with the application of a restriction enzyme, which can selectively cleave a DNA molecule wherever a short, specific sequence is recognized in a process known as a restriction digest. The DNA fragments produced by the digest are then separated by length through a process known as agarose gel electrophoresis and transferred to a membrane via the Southern blot procedure. Hybridization of the membrane to a labeled DNA probe then determines the length of the fragments which are complementary to the probe. A restriction fragment length polymorphism is said to occur when the length of a detected fragment varies between individuals, indicating non-identical sequence homologies. Each fragment length is considered an allele, whether it actually contains a coding region or not, and can be used in subsequent genetic analysis.

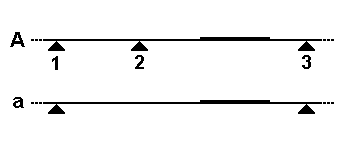
Schematic for RFLP by cleavage site loss

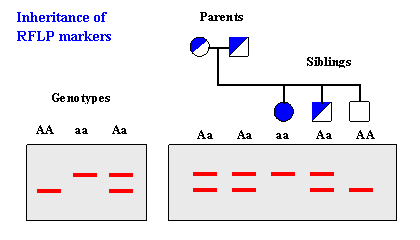
Analysis and inheritance of allelic RFLP fragments (NIH)

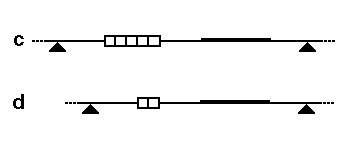
Schematic for RFLP by VNTR length variation

=== Examples ===
There are two common mechanisms by which the size of a particular restriction fragment can vary. In the first schematic, a small segment of the genome is being detected by a DNA probe (thicker line). In allele A, the genome is cleaved by a restriction enzyme at three nearby sites (triangles), but only the rightmost fragment will be detected by the probe. In allele a, restriction site 2 has been lost by a mutation, so the probe now detects the larger fused fragment running from sites 1 to 3. The second diagram shows how this fragment size variation would look on a Southern blot, and how each allele (two per individual) might be inherited in members of a family.

In the third schematic, the probe and restriction enzyme are chosen to detect a region of the genome that includes a variable number tandem repeat (VNTR) segment (boxes in schematic diagram). In allele c, there are five repeats in the VNTR, and the probe detects a longer fragment between the two restriction sites. In allele d, there are only two repeats in the VNTR, so the probe detects a shorter fragment between the same two restriction sites. Other genetic processes, such as insertions, deletions, translocations, and inversions, can also lead to polymorphisms. RFLP tests require much larger samples of DNA than do short tandem repeat (STR) tests.

== Applications ==
Analysis of RFLP variation in genomes was formerly a vital tool in genome mapping and genetic disease analysis. If researchers were trying to initially determine the chromosomal location of a particular disease gene, they would analyze the DNA of members of a family afflicted by the disease, and look for RFLP alleles that show a similar pattern of inheritance as that of the disease (see genetic linkage). Once a disease gene was localized, RFLP analysis of other families could reveal who was at risk for the disease, or who was likely to be a carrier of the mutant genes. RFLP test is used in identification and differentiation of organisms by analyzing unique patterns in genome. It is also used in identification of recombination rate in the loci between restriction sites.

RFLP analysis was also the basis for early methods of genetic fingerprinting, useful in the identification of samples retrieved from crime scenes, in the determination of paternity, and in the characterization of genetic diversity or breeding patterns in animal populations.

== Alternatives ==
The technique for RFLP analysis is, however, slow and cumbersome. It requires a large amount of sample DNA, and the combined process of probe labeling, DNA fragmentation, electrophoresis, blotting, hybridization, washing, and autoradiography can take up to a month to complete. A limited version of the RFLP method that used oligonucleotide probes was reported in 1985. The results of the Human Genome Project have largely replaced the need for RFLP mapping, and the identification of many single-nucleotide polymorphisms (SNPs) in that project (as well as the direct identification of many disease genes and mutations) has replaced the need for RFLP disease linkage analysis (see SNP genotyping). The analysis of VNTR alleles continues, but is now usually performed by polymerase chain reaction (PCR) methods. For example, the standard protocols for DNA fingerprinting involve PCR analysis of panels of more than a dozen VNTRs.

RFLP is still used in marker-assisted selection. Terminal restriction fragment length polymorphism (TRFLP or sometimes T-RFLP) is a technique initially developed for characterizing bacterial communities in mixed-species samples. The technique has also been applied to other groups including soil fungi. TRFLP works by PCR amplification of DNA using primer pairs that have been labeled with fluorescent tags. The PCR products are then digested using RFLP enzymes and the resulting patterns visualized using a DNA sequencer. The results are analyzed either by simply counting and comparing bands or peaks in the TRFLP profile, or by matching bands from one or more TRFLP runs to a database of known species. A number of different software tools have been developed to automate the process of band matching, comparison and data basing of TRFLP profiles.

The technique is similar in some aspects to temperature gradient or denaturing gradient gel electrophoresis (TGGE and DGGE).

The sequence changes directly involved with an RFLP can also be analyzed more quickly by PCR. Amplification can be directed across the altered restriction site, and the products digested with the restriction enzyme. This method has been called Cleaved Amplified Polymorphic Sequence (CAPS). Alternatively, the amplified segment can be analyzed by allele-specific oligonucleotide (ASO) probes, a process that can often be done by a simple dot blot.

== See also ==
- Amplified fragment length polymorphism (AFLP)
- RAPD
- STR analysis
