= Anubha Mahajan =

Human genetics researcher

Anubha Mahajan is a human genetics researcher whose career has focused on genetic analysis of complex traits, with an emphasis on type 2 diabetes. Mahajan has co-led and led analysis of high-throughput genetic studies as part of large international consortia, such as DIAGRAM, GoT2D, T2D-GENES, and DIAMANTE, that explore the genetic architecture of type 2 diabetes. More recently, she has moved from genetic discovery to utilizing human genetics research to understand the pathophysiological mechanisms that contribute to type 2 diabetes.

== Education ==
Mahajan completed her PhD at the Dr. B.R. Ambedkar Centre for Biomedical Research at the University of Delhi. Subsequently, she worked as Research Associate at the Institute of Genomics and Integrative Biology at the Council of Scientific and Industrial Research, New Delhi. Until January 2020, she was Senior Team Leader in Human Genetics in the McCarthy/Diabetes Group at the Wellcome Centre for Human Genetics at the University of Oxford. Currently, she is a Senior Scientist at Genentech.

== Research career ==
Mahajan has been a prolific and leading researcher in the field of human genetics, specifically with regard to type 2 diabetes. In 2018, she lead-authored two manuscripts published in Nature Genetics. One study focused on refining the accuracy of validated target identification through fine-mapping of coding variants in type 2 diabetes. The other publication focused on using high-density imputation and pancreatic islet-specific epigenome maps to fine-map type 2 diabetes susceptibility loci to a single genetic variant-resolution.
