= Amanda M. Hulse-Kemp =

American computational biologist and researcher

Academic background
- Education: University of Nevada, Reno; Texas A&M University
- Doctoral advisor: David Stelly

Academic work
- Discipline: Computational biology
- Institutions: Agricultural Research Service; North Carolina State University
- Notable works: CottonSNP63K Array

Amanda M. Hulse-Kemp is a computational biologist with the United States Department of Agriculture – Agricultural Research Service. She works in the Genomics and Bioinformatics Research Unit and is stationed on the North Carolina State University campus in Raleigh, North Carolina.

== Early life ==
Amanda Hulse-Kemp grew up in Harrisonburg, Virginia. She earned her Bachelor of Science Degree in Biology and Animal Biotechnology from the University of Nevada, Reno, in 2010. Hulse-Kemp earned her Ph.D. in 2015 from Texas A&M University's Interdisciplinary Graduate Program in Genetics, where her doctoral advisor was Dr. David Stelly. In Stelly's lab, she coordinated the development of the CottonSNP63K Array, the first of its kind for cotton. The CottonSNP63K array has already been utilized to make characterization of germplasm resources more efficient and to identify economically important genes. She and Dr. Stelly also formed International Cotton SNP Chip Consortium. She completed postdoctoral research at the Seed Biotechnology Center at the University of California, Davis, where she focused on bioinformatics, resource development and integration of genomics and biotechnology tools for enhancing breeding of vegetables and other crops. At the center, she assisted in genetic analyses of pepper, cotton, tomato, coffee, and spinach.

== Career ==
Hulse-Kemp works as a computational biologist at the intersection of genomics and biotechnology and crop breeding. She works with the United States Department of Agriculture – Agriculture Research Service in the Genomics and Bioinformatics Research Unit. Her current research focus involves utilizing bioinformatics to enhance ARS breeding programs in both plants and animals. She is a USDA assistant professor at North Carolina State University in the Department of Crop and Soil Sciences. She collaborated on the Coffee Genome Project, which aims to sequence Coffea arabica and to examine inter-variety diversity. She was part of the team behind the first sequencing of the C. arabica genome.

== Awards and Publications ==
As a PhD. student at Texas A&M University, she earned the Ethel Ashworth-Tsutsui Memorial Award for Research in 2014, the Texas A&M University Distinguished Graduate Student award, the Dean's Outstanding Achievement Award for Graduate Research, and the BB Singh Award for Crop Science Thesis.

Hulse-Kemp has co-authored the following publications:

- "Evolutionary Analysis of Sequence Divergence and Diversity of Duplicate Genes in Aspergillus fumigatus" in Evolutionary Bioinformatics, 2012
- "Insights into the Evolution of Cotton Diploids and Polyploids from Whole-Genome Resequencing" in Genes, Genomes, Genetics, 2013
- "Haplotype phasing after joint estimation of recombination and linkage disequilibrium in breeding populations" in Journal of Animal Science and Biotechnology, 2013
- "Sequencing of allotetraploid cotton (Gossypium hirsutum L. acc. TM-1) provides a resource for fiber improvement" in Nature Biotechnology, 2015
- "BAC-End Sequence-Based SNP Mining in Allotetraploid Cotton (Gossypium) Utilizing Resequencing Data, Phylogenetic Inferences, and Perspectives for Genetic Mapping" in Genes, Genomes, Genetics, 2015
- "DNA Sequence Evolution and Rare Homoeologous Conversion in Tetraploid Cotton" & a Correct in PLOS Genetics, 2016
- "Diversity analysis of cotton (Gossypium hirsutum L.) germplasm using the CottonSNP63K Array" in BMC Plant Biology, 2017
- "Sub genome-anchored physical frameworks of the allotetraploid Upland cotton (Gossypium hirsutum L.) genome, and an approach toward reference-grade assemblies of polyploids" in Scientific Reports, 2017
- "Comparative transcriptomics and genomic patterns of discordance in Capsiceae (Solanaceae)" in Molecular Phylogenetics and Evolution, 2018
- "Feeding high-oleic peanuts to layer hens enhances egg yolk color and oleic fatty acid content in shell eggs" in Poultry Science, 2019
- "Enhancing Upland cotton for drought resilience, productivity, and fiber quality: comparative evaluation and genetic dissection" in Molecular Genetics and Genomics, 2020

She has been lead author on the following publications:

- "Genetic Variants Contribute to Gene Expression Variability in Humans" in Genetics, 2013
- "Development and bin mapping of gene-associated interspecific SNPs for cotton (Gossypium hirsutum L.) introgression breeding efforts" in BMC Genomics, 2014
- "Development of 63K SNP Array for Cotton and High-Density Mapping of Intraspecific and Interspecific Populations of Gossypium spp" in Genes, Genomes, Genetics, 2015
- "A HapMap leads to a Capsicum annuum SNP infinium array: a new tool for pepper breeding" in Horticulture Research, 2016
- "Reference Quality Assembly of the 3.5 Gb genome of Capsicum annuum from a Single Linked-Read Library" in Horticulture Research, 2018
