= Fine-mapping =

Set of methods in genetics

Schematic example of statistical fine-mapping using a locus with two causal variants. A. In one-variant-at-a-time association testing, each SNP is tested separately. A non-causal tagging variant can show the strongest marginal association if it is correlated with both causal variants. B. In statistical fine-mapping, variants are compared jointly rather than only one at a time. The two causal variants receive high posterior inclusion probabilities (PIPs), while the non-causal tagging variant receives low PIP after the causal effects are accounted for. The braces indicate two 95% credible sets, each corresponding to one association signal.

Fine-mapping is a set of methods in genetics used to identify the genetic variant or variants, often single-nucleotide polymorphisms (SNPs), most likely to explain an observed association between a genetic locus and a phenotype. It is commonly used during genetic association studies, including quantitative trait locus (QTL) analyses and genome-wide association studies (GWAS).

In QTL analysis, regions of the genome are tested for association with variation in a quantitative trait. Many QTL studies measure molecular traits, such as gene expression, chromatin accessibility, splicing or protein abundance, and are therefore often described as molecular QTL studies. One example is an expression quantitative trait locus (eQTL), in which genetic variants at a locus are associated with differences in gene expression. This could for instance occur if the variant falls in the promoter of the gene, thereby affecting binding of a transcription factor which regulates gene expression. On the other hand, in GWAS, genetic variants across the genome are tested for association with traits or diseases, often organism-level phenotypes.

In both QTL studies and GWAS, an association signal often does not identify a single causal variant in a locus. This is due to a phenomenon called genetic linkage, where alleles close together on a chromosome are often inherited together during meiosis. Genetic linkage can contribute to linkage disequilibrium (LD), the non-random association of alleles at different loci in a population. Therefore, several nearby variants are inherited together more often than expected by chance. Suppose that two nearby SNPs are usually inherited together, so that allele T at one SNP is commonly found on the same chromosome as allele G at another SNP. If the T allele affects a phenotype, association testing may also detect an association with G, even if G has no biological effect. Fine-mapping attempts to distinguish the variant that is more likely to cause the trait from nearby variants that are only associated because of LD.

== Statistical fine-mapping ==
=== Defining the target locus ===
In statistical fine-mapping, the target locus is the set of variants that are compared as candidate explanations for an association signal. The way this set is obtained depends on the design of the association study and the fine-mapping pipeline. In GWAS fine-mapping, loci are often defined around variants that reach a significance threshold, and overlapping regions may be merged. Some genome-wide fine-mapping pipelines instead analyze fixed or overlapping windows across the genome to reduce dependence on manually chosen locus boundaries.

In molecular QTL studies, the candidate variants are often constrained by the molecular feature being tested. For example, cis-eQTL mapping commonly tests variants near the gene whose expression is measured, often within a window around the gene's transcription start site. Fine-mapping can then be applied within the resulting eQTL region to refine the set of candidate causal variants.

=== Methods ===
Given a selected locus, many statistical fine-mapping methods can be viewed as a form of variable selection in a regression model. The variants in the locus are treated as candidate explanatory variables, and the phenotype or molecular trait is treated as the outcome. The aim is to identify which variant or variants are needed to explain the association signal, while accounting for the fact that nearby variants may be correlated because of linkage disequilibrium. Both association strength and LD are needed because the variant with the strongest association is not necessarily causal. For example, suppose that a locus contains two causal SNPs and one nearby non-causal SNP. If the non-causal SNP is correlated with both causal SNPs across individuals, its genotype pattern may partially track both causal genotype patterns. It may therefore show the strongest association with the trait in a one-variant-at-a-time test, even though it has no biological effect.

Fine-mapping methods address this by comparing variants jointly rather than only one at a time. In the example above, a joint model can ask whether the non-causal SNP is still needed after the two causal SNPs are considered. If its apparent association is explained by its correlation with the causal variants, the non-causal SNP receives less support. The model may instead identify two separate signals, each representing one causal effect.

==== Input data ====
Fine-mapping methods can use different forms of input data. In individual-level analyses, the method has access to the genotypes and phenotypes of the same individuals. The genotypes can be represented as a matrix in which rows correspond to individuals and columns correspond to variants in the locus. For a biallelic SNP, individuals may carry zero, one, or two copies of a given allele. For example, if a SNP has alleles C and T, the genotypes CC, CT and TT can be coded as 0, 1 and 2 copies of the T allele. In imputed genotype data, this value may instead be represented as a dosage between 0 and 2.

In this setting, the correlation among nearby variants is already contained in the genotype matrix. If two SNPs are in linkage disequilibrium, their genotype columns will be correlated across individuals. Fine-mapping methods can therefore model variants in the locus together with the phenotype, rather than relying only on one-variant-at-a-time association results.

In many GWAS applications, individual-level genotype and phenotype data from the original study are not available to the fine-mapping method. Fine-mapping is therefore often performed from association summary statistics. These summary statistics are produced by association testing.

Association testing is commonly formulated as a regression model, in which the phenotype or molecular trait is the response variable and the genotype of one variant is an explanatory variable. Covariates such as age, sex, technical factors or ancestry-related variables may be included in the model to reduce confounding effects such as population stratification. Repeating this test across many variants produces association statistics, such as effect estimates, standard errors, z-scores and P-values.

These summary statistics describe the association evidence for each variant, but they do not by themselves describe the correlation among variants in the locus. When summary statistics are used for fine-mapping, the LD information is therefore provided separately, usually as an LD matrix. An LD matrix is a square table in which both rows and columns are variants in the same locus, and each entry describes the correlation between a pair of variants. For example, if a locus contains SNP1, SNP2 and SNP3, the LD matrix records the correlation between SNP1 and SNP2, between SNP1 and SNP3, and between SNP2 and SNP3. A high correlation value in the LD matrix means that the genotypes of two variants tend to vary together across individuals.

The two input types therefore provide similar information in different forms. With individual-level data, the relationship between genotype and phenotype and the correlation among variants can be estimated from the same data. With summary statistics, the association evidence and the LD information are supplied separately and must be compatible. For example, the LD reference panel should be genetically similar to the population used in the association study; otherwise, the correlations among variants may not reflect those present in the original study sample. A variant that is highly correlated with the causal variant in one population may be less correlated with it in another population. If the wrong correlation structure is used, fine-mapping may assign support to the wrong candidate variant.

==== Output data ====
Statistical fine-mapping methods usually produce probabilistic outputs rather than a single definitive causal variant. A common output is the posterior inclusion probability (PIP), which is assigned to each variant in the locus. The PIP represents the probability, under the model and given the available data, that a variant contributes to the association signal. Variants with higher PIP are considered stronger candidates for being causal, but PIP does not by itself demonstrate a biological mechanism.

Another common output is a credible set. A credible set is a group of variants whose posterior probabilities together reach a chosen probability threshold. For example, to construct a 95% credible set, variants can be ranked by posterior probability and added to the set until their cumulative posterior probability reaches at least 95%. Under the assumptions of the model, the resulting set is intended to contain a causal variant with probability at least 95%. Credible sets are useful when several variants are too highly correlated to be distinguished individually. In that case, fine-mapping may narrow the association signal to a small group of plausible variants rather than selecting only one SNP.

Some fine-mapping methods can report more than one credible set in the same locus. In this interpretation, each credible set represents one association signal, and each contains variants that cannot be further separated statistically. For example, a locus with two independent causal effects may produce two credible sets, while a locus with one unresolved signal may produce one credible set containing several highly correlated variants.

== Use of fine-mapping results ==
Fine-mapping results are commonly used to prioritize candidate variants for biological interpretation. Instead of treating all variants in an associated locus equally, or risking focus on variants that are associated only because of linkage disequilibrium, researchers can prioritize variants with high posterior inclusion probability. These variants may then be examined further, for example by overlapping them with functional annotations or by testing them experimentally.

In molecular QTL studies, the measured phenotype is already a molecular trait, such as gene expression. Therefore, a fine-mapped eQTL variant has a more direct functional interpretation than a variant fine-mapped from a GWAS of a disease or organism-level trait. However, fine-mapping an eQTL does not by itself identify the precise molecular mechanism by which the variant affects expression. For example, the variant could affect transcription factor binding, enhancer activity, promoter activity, RNA stability or another regulatory process. Overlap with functional annotations, such as chromatin marks, transcription factor binding sites, promoter or enhancer annotations, or predictions from deep learning models, can suggest which variants are the most plausible. Furthermore, because the associated trait is already molecular, these hypotheses can often be tested more directly, for example by measuring gene expression changes after genetically engineering the causal variant into the genome.i

In GWAS, the associated phenotype is often a disease or organism-level trait, so the connection between a candidate variant and the relevant gene or molecular mechanism is usually less direct. For this reason, GWAS fine-mapping is often combined with molecular QTL data. For example, colocalization methods can compare a GWAS association signal with a QTL signal to test whether both are consistent with being driven by the same causal variant. If a GWAS signal and an eQTL signal colocalize, this supports the hypothesis that the variant may affect the GWAS phenotype through regulation of that gene.

== Challenges and future perspectives ==
Although fine-mapping has become a fundamental step in GWAS and QTL analysis, it still faces several challenges and novel methods have recently arisen to offset its weaknesses.

A central issue with fine-mapping is model misspecification. Most statistical fine-mapping methods utilize linear additive genetic models to describe the relationship between genotype and trait. Even if experimental evidence suggests the additivity of effects is the main driver of genetic variation in complex traits, other non-linear and non-additive effects such as epistasis and dominance may also contribute to trait variation.

Moreover, existing fine-mapping methods generally account for population stratification using principal components derived from individuals' genotypes or further random effects terms. These approaches may fall short of fully controlling for complex population structures, particularly in admixed populations.

Importantly, high linkage disequilibrium remains a central limitation of fine-mapping. When several variants are strongly correlated, association data may not contain enough information to distinguish which variant is causal, and the result may remain a broad credible set rather than a single high-confidence variant. Multi-ancestry fine-mapping can improve resolution in some cases because LD patterns differ across populations. If the same causal variant is shared across ancestries, but its correlations with neighbouring variants differ, combining ancestry groups can help separate the causal variant from variants that only tag it.

Variants with low minor allele frequency (MAF) pose a different challenge. Rare or low-frequency variants are carried by fewer individuals, reducing the power of association tests. They may also be poorly imputed, excluded during quality control, or absent from the LD reference panel. If a causal low-frequency variant is missing from the analysis, it cannot be included in the credible set and the posterior inclusion probabilities of the remaining variants may be misleading.

Functional annotations and sequence-based prediction models can also provide additional information when statistical evidence alone is limited. Annotation-informed fine-mapping methods use features such as regulatory annotations, conservation scores or chromatin marks to help prioritize among variants that are difficult to distinguish statistically. Deep learning models, such as AlphaGenome, can predict variant effects from DNA sequence, including effects on regulatory processes such as gene expression, chromatin accessibility, transcription factor binding or splicing. These predictions may add functional evidence for candidate variants, especially when variants are difficult to distinguish because of high LD or low statistical power. However, they remain dependent on model assumptions.

== See also ==
- AlphaGenome
- Association mapping
- Common disease-common variant hypothesis
- Expression quantitative trait loci
- Gene–environment interaction
- Genetic diversity
- Genetic epidemiology
- Genetic linkage
- Genomics
- Linkage disequilibrium
- Molecular epidemiology
- Polygenic score
- Population genetics
- Quantitative trait locus
- Transcriptome-wide association study
