= SNP array =

Technique for detecting polymorphisms in a genome

In molecular biology, SNP array is a type of DNA microarray which is used to detect polymorphisms within a population. A single nucleotide polymorphism (SNP), a variation at a single site in DNA, is the most frequent type of variation in the genome. Around 335 million SNPs have been identified in the human genome, 15 million of which are present at frequencies of 1% or higher across different populations worldwide.

== Principles ==
The basic principles of SNP array are the same as the DNA microarray. These are the convergence of DNA hybridization, fluorescence microscopy, and solid surface DNA capture. The three mandatory components of the SNP arrays are:

1. An array containing immobilized allele-specific oligonucleotide (ASO) probes.
2. Fragmented nucleic acid sequences of target, labelled with fluorescent dyes.
3. A detection system that records and interprets the hybridization signal.

The ASO probes are often chosen based on sequencing of a representative panel of individuals: positions found to vary in the panel at a specified frequency are used as the basis for probes. SNP chips are generally described by the number of SNP positions they assay. Two probes must be used for each SNP position to detect both alleles; if only one probe were used, experimental failure would be indistinguishable from homozygosity of the non-probed allele.

== Applications ==
DNA copy number profile for the T47D breast cancer cell line (Affymetrix SNP Array)

LOH profile for the T47D breast cancer cell line (Affymetrix SNP Array)

An SNP array is a useful tool for studying slight variations between whole genomes. The most important clinical applications of SNP arrays are for determining disease susceptibility and for measuring the efficacy of drug therapies designed specifically for individuals. In research, SNP arrays are most frequently used for genome-wide association studies. Each individual has many SNPs. SNP-based genetic linkage analysis can be used to map disease loci, and determine disease susceptibility genes in individuals. The combination of SNP maps and high density SNP arrays allows SNPs to be used as markers for genetic diseases that have complex traits. For example, genome-wide association studies have identified SNPs associated with diseases such as rheumatoid arthritis and prostate cancer. A SNP array can also be used to generate a virtual karyotype using software to determine the copy number of each SNP on the array and then align the SNPs in chromosomal order.

SNPs can also be used to study genetic abnormalities in cancer. For example, SNP arrays can be used to study loss of heterozygosity (LOH). LOH occurs when one allele of a gene is mutated in a deleterious way and the normally-functioning allele is lost. LOH occurs commonly in oncogenesis. For example, tumor suppressor genes help keep cancer from developing. If a person has one mutated and dysfunctional copy of a tumor suppressor gene and his second, functional copy of the gene gets damaged, they may become more likely to develop cancer.

Other chip-based methods such as comparative genomic hybridization can detect genomic gains or deletions leading to LOH. SNP arrays, however, have an additional advantage of being able to detect copy-neutral LOH (also called uniparental disomy or gene conversion). Copy-neutral LOH is a form of allelic imbalance. In copy-neutral LOH, one allele or whole chromosome from a parent is missing. This problem leads to duplication of the other parental allele. Copy-neutral LOH may be pathological. For example, say that the mother's allele is wild-type and fully functional, and the father's allele is mutated. If the mother's allele is missing and the child has two copies of the father's mutant allele, disease can occur.

High density SNP arrays help scientists identify patterns of allelic imbalance. These studies have potential prognostic and diagnostic uses. Because LOH is so common in many human cancers, SNP arrays have great potential in cancer diagnostics. For example, recent SNP array studies have shown that solid tumors such as gastric cancer and liver cancer show LOH, as do non-solid malignancies such as hematologic malignancies, ALL, MDS, CML and others. These studies may provide insights into how these diseases develop, as well as information about how to create therapies for them.

Breeding in a number of animal and plant species has been revolutionized by the emergence of SNP arrays. The method is based on the prediction of genetic merit by incorporating relationships among individuals based on SNP array data. This process is known as genomic selection. Crop-specific arrays find use in agriculture.
