= Expression quantitative trait loci =

Genomic loci that explain variation in gene expression levels

An expression quantitative trait locus (eQTL) is a type of quantitative trait locus (QTL), a genomic locus (region of DNA) that is associated with phenotypic variation for a specific, quantifiable trait. While the term QTL can refer to a wide range of phenotypic traits, the more specific eQTL refers to traits measured by gene expression, such as mRNA levels. Although named "expression QTLs", not all measures of gene expression can be used for eQTLs. For example, traits quantified by protein levels are instead referred to as protein QTLs (pQTLs).

== Distant and local, trans- and cis-eQTLs, respectively ==
An expression quantitative trait is an amount of an mRNA transcript or a protein. These are usually the product of a single gene with a specific chromosomal location. This distinguishes expression quantitative traits from most complex traits, which are not the product of the expression of a single gene. Chromosomal loci that explain variance in expression traits are called eQTLs. eQTLs located near the gene-of-origin (gene which produces the transcript or protein) are referred to as local eQTLs or cis-eQTLs. By contrast, those located distant from their gene of origin, often on different chromosomes, are referred to as distant eQTLs or trans-eQTLs. The first genome-wide study of gene expression was carried out in yeast and published in 2002. The initial wave of eQTL studies employed microarrays to measure genome-wide gene expression; more recent studies have employed massively parallel RNA sequencing. Many expression QTL studies were performed in plants and animals, including humans, non-human primates and mice.

Some cis eQTLs are detected in many tissue types but the majority of trans eQTLs are tissue-dependent (dynamic). eQTLs may act in cis (locally) or trans (at a distance) to a gene. The abundance of a gene transcript is directly modified by polymorphism in regulatory elements. Consequently, transcript abundance might be considered as a quantitative trait that can be mapped with considerable power. These have been named expression QTLs (eQTLs). The combination of whole-genome genetic association studies and the measurement of global gene expression allows the systematic identification of eQTLs. By assaying gene expression and genetic variation simultaneously on a genome-wide basis in a large number of individuals, statistical genetic methods can be used to map the genetic factors that underpin individual differences in quantitative levels of expression of many thousands of transcripts. Studies have shown that single nucleotide polymorphisms (SNPs) reproducibly associated with complex disorders as well as certain pharmacologic phenotypes are found to be significantly enriched for eQTLs, relative to frequency-matched control SNPs. The integration of eQTLs with GWAS has led to development of the transcriptome-wide association study (TWAS) methodology.

== Detecting eQTLs ==
Mapping eQTLs is done using standard QTL mapping methods that test the linkage between variation in expression and genetic polymorphisms. The only considerable difference is that eQTL studies can involve a million or more expression microtraits. Standard gene mapping software packages can be used, although it is often faster to use custom code such as QTL Reaper or the web-based eQTL mapping system GeneNetwork. GeneNetwork hosts many large eQTL mapping data sets and provide access to fast algorithms to map single loci and epistatic interactions. As is true in all QTL mapping studies, the final steps in defining DNA variants that cause variation in traits are usually difficult and require a second round of experimentation. This is especially the case for trans eQTLs that do not benefit from the strong prior probability that relevant variants are in the immediate vicinity of the parent gene. Statistical, graphical, and bioinformatic methods are used to evaluate positional candidate genes and entire systems of interactions. The development of single cell technologies, and parallel advances in statistical methods has made it possible to define even subtle changes in eQTLs as cell-states change. Recent methods have enabled quick and efficient genome-wide mapping of eQTLs at single cell resolution. After eQTLs have been detected, statistical fine-mapping can be used to refine the set of candidate causal variants within an eQTL region. This is often necessary because nearby variants in linkage disequilibrium may show similar associations with gene expression, even when only one or a few variants directly affect the molecular trait.

== See also ==
- Epigenome-wide association study
- Fine-mapping
- Quantitative trait locus (QTL)
- Transcriptome-wide association study
