= AlphaGenome =

Large-scale deep-learning system developed by DeepMind

AlphaGenome is a large-scale deep-learning system developed by DeepMind to predict how segments of DNA regulate gene expression and how single-nucleotide variants may disrupt that regulation. It was launched on 25 June 2025. Subject to following the terms of use, the API can be used free of charge, for non-commercial use.

== Background ==
Since the first draft of the human genome appeared in 2001, most of its over 3 billion letters have remained functionally opaque. AlphaGenome extends DeepMind's "Alpha" line of models beyond protein folding and chip design into the longstanding puzzle of the genome's non-coding dark matter.

== Model ==
AlphaGenome accepts stretches of up to one million base pairs, orders of magnitude longer than typical sequence-to-function models, and produces thousands of quantitative predictions, including gene-expression levels, chromatin accessibility, three-dimensional genome contacts and RNA-splicing junctions. The model was trained using genomic data from humans and mice, and its effectiveness on other organisms has not been tested. The model is able to predict what impact changing a single letter/base in the million base sequence has on the outcome.

The model can predict across 11 modalities concurrently: RNA-seq, CAGE and PRO-cap (gene expression), splice sites, splice site usage and splice junctions (splicing patterns), DNase, ATAC-seq, histone modifications and transcription factor binding (chromatin state) and chromatin contact maps. An evaluation of 24 genome tracks, using all 11 modalities found that AlphaGenome outperformed the best alternative models in 22 of these evaluations. Current limitations include difficulty in predicting the effects of mutations on genes located more than 100,000 base pairs away.
