= Allele-specific oligonucleotide =

Short piece of synthetic DNA

An anti-sense oligonucleotide (ASO) is a short piece of synthetic DNA complementary to the sequence of a variable target DNA. It acts as a probe for the presence of the target in a Southern blot assay or, more commonly, in the simpler dot blot assay. It is a common tool used in genetic testing, forensics, and molecular biology research.

An ASO is typically an oligonucleotide of 15–21 nucleotide bases in length. It is designed (and used) in a way that makes it specific for only one version, or allele, of the DNA being tested. The length of the ASO, which strand it is chosen from, and the conditions by which it is bound to (and washed from) the target DNA all play a role in its specificity. These probes can usually be designed to detect a difference of as little as 1 base in the target's genetic sequence, a basic ability in the assay of single-nucleotide polymorphisms (SNPs), important in genotype analysis and the Human Genome Project. To be detected after it has bound to its target, the ASO must be labeled with a radioactive, enzymatic, or fluorescent tag. The Illumina Methylation Assay technology takes advantage of ASO to detect one base pair difference (cytosine versus thymine) to measure methylation at a specific CpG site.

== Example ==
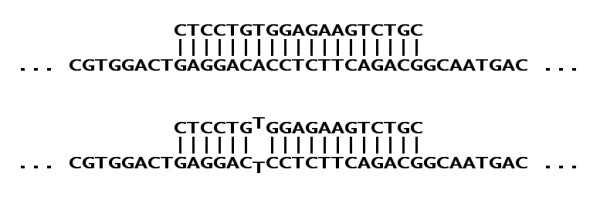
Binding of the "S" ASO probe to "S" DNA (top) or "A" DNA (bottom).

The human disease sickle cell anemia is caused by a genetic mutation in the codon for the sixth amino acid of the blood protein beta-hemoglobin. The normal DNA sequence G-A-G codes for the amino acid glutamate, while the mutation changes the middle adenine to a thymine, leading to the sequence G-T-G (G-U-G in the mRNA). This altered sequence substitutes a valine into the final protein, distorting its structure.

To test for the presence of the mutation in a DNA sample, an ASO probe would be synthesized to be complementary to the altered sequence, here labeled as "S". As a control, another ASO would be synthesized for the normal sequence "A". Each ASO is fully complementary to its target sequence (and will bind strongly), but has a single mismatch against its non-target allele (leading to weaker interaction). The first diagram shows how the "S" probe is fully complementary to the "S" target (top), but is partially mismatched against the "A" target (bottom).

Schematic of dot-blots using the "A" or "S" ASO probes.

A segment of the beta-hemoglobin genes in the sample DNA(s) would be amplified by PCR, and the resulting products applied to duplicate support membranes as Dot blots. The sample's DNA strands are separated with alkali, and each ASO probe is applied to a different blot. After hybridization, a washing protocol is used which can discriminate between the fully complementary and the mismatched hybrids. The mismatched ASOs are washed off of the blots, while the matched ASOs (and their labels) remain.

In the second diagram, six samples of amplified DNA have been applied to each of the two blots. Detection of the ASO label that remains after washing allows a direct reading of the genotype of the samples, each with two copies of the beta-hemoglobin gene. Samples 1 and 4 only have the normal "A" allele, while samples 3 and 5 have both the "A" and "S" alleles (and are therefore heterozygous carriers of this recessive mutation). Samples 2 and 6 have only the "S" allele, and would be affected by the disease. The small amount of 'cross hybridization' shown is typical, and is considered in the process of interpreting the final results.

== Alternatives ==
ASO analysis is only one of the methods used to detect genetic polymorphisms. Direct DNA sequencing is used to initially characterize the mutation, but is too laborious for routine screening. An earlier method, Restriction Fragment Length Polymorphism (RFLP) didn't need to know the sequence change beforehand, but required that the mutation affect the cleavage site of a Restriction Enzyme. The RFLP assay was briefly adapted to the use of oligonucleotide probes, but this technique was quickly supplanted by ASO analysis of polymerase chain reaction (PCR) amplified DNA. The PCR technique itself has been adapted to detect polymorphisms, as allele-specific PCR. However, the simplicity and versatility of the combined PCR/ASO method has led to its continued use, including with non-radioactive labels, and in a "reverse dot blot" format where the ASO probes are bound to the membrane and the amplified sample DNA is used for hybridization.

== History ==
The use of synthetic oligonucleotides as specific probes for genetic sequence variations was pioneered by R. Bruce Wallace, working at the City of Hope National Medical Center in Duarte, California. In 1979 Wallace and his coworkers reported the use of ASO probes to detect variations in a single-stranded bacterial virus, and later applied the technique to cloned human genes. In 1983 and 1985 Wallace's lab reported the detection of the mutation for sickle cell anemia in samples of whole genomic DNA, although this application was hampered by the small amount of label that could be carried by the ASO.

Fortunately PCR, a method to greatly amplify a specific segment of DNA, was also reported in 1985. In less than a year PCR had been paired with ASO analysis. This combination solved the problem of ASO labeling, since the amount of target DNA could be amplified over a million-fold. Also, the specificity of the PCR process itself could be added to that of the ASO probes, greatly reducing the problem of spurious binding of the ASO to non-target sequences. The combination was specific enough that it could be used in a simple Dot blot, avoiding the laborious and inefficient Southern blot method.

== Other uses ==
ASO-PCR may also be used to detect minimal residual disease in blood cancers such as multiple myeloma.
