= Batch effect =

Non-biological variation in the results of biological experiments

In molecular biology, a batch effect occurs when non-biological factors in an experiment cause changes in the data produced by the experiment. Such effects can lead to inaccurate conclusions when their causes are correlated with one or more outcomes of interest in an experiment. They are common in many types of high-throughput sequencing experiments, including those using microarrays, mass spectrometers, and single-cell RNA-sequencing data. They are most commonly discussed in the context of genomics and high-throughput sequencing research, but they exist in other fields of science as well.

== Definitions ==
Multiple definitions of the term "batch effect" have been proposed in the literature. Lazar et al. (2013) noted, "Providing a complete and unambiguous definition of the so-called batch effect is a challenging task, especially because its origins and the way it manifests in the data are not completely known or not recorded." Focusing on microarray experiments, they propose a new definition based on several previous ones: "[T]he batch effect represents the systematic technical differences when samples are processed and measured in different batches and which are unrelated to any biological variation recorded during the MAGE [microarray gene expression] experiment."

== Causes ==
Many potentially variable factors have been identified as potential causes of batch effects, including the following:

- Laboratory conditions
- Choice of reagent lot or batch
- Personnel differences
- Time of day when the experiment was conducted
- Atmospheric ozone levels
- Instruments used to conduct the experiment

== Correction ==
Various statistical techniques have been developed to attempt to correct for batch effects in high-throughput experiments. These techniques are intended for use during the stages of experimental design and data analysis. They have historically mostly focused on genomics experiments, and have only recently begun to expand into other scientific fields such as proteomics. One problem associated with such techniques is that they may unintentionally remove actual biological variation. Some techniques that have been used to detect and/or correct for batch effects include the following:

- For microarray data, linear mixed models have been used, with confounding factors included as random intercepts.
- In 2007, Johnson et al. proposed an empirical Bayesian technique for correcting for batch effects. This approach represented an improvement over previous methods in that it could be effectively used with small batch sizes.
- In 2012, the sva software package was introduced. It includes multiple functions to adjust for batch effects, including the use of surrogate variable estimation, which had previously been shown to improve reproducibility and reduce dependence in high-throughput experiments.
- For image-based cell profiling, Caicedo et al. (2017) recommended plotting heat maps of the correlations between all pairs of wells, in which batch effects appear as patterns of high correlation. To correct them, the authors suggested normalizing the data within each plate rather than across all plates at once, provided the samples are spread roughly at random over the plates.
- Haghverdi et al. (2018) proposed a technique designed for single-cell RNA-seq data, based on the detection of mutual nearest neighbors in the data.
- Papiez et al. (2019) proposed a dynamic programming algorithm to identify batch effects of unknown value in high-throughput data.
- Voß et al. (2022) proposed an algorithm called HarmonizR which enables data harmonization across independent proteomic datasets with appropriate handling of missing values.
- Arevalo et al. (2024) tested ten batch-correction methods developed for single-cell RNA-seq on image-based profiling data from JUMP, a Cell Painting dataset. Harmony and Seurat RPCA ranked among the top three methods in each of five scenarios, which ranged from batches prepared in one laboratory over time to batches imaged on different microscopes in several laboratories.
