= Cetus Corporation =

Pioneering biotech company in California, US

- Company type: Public
- Traded as: Nasdaq: CTUS
- Industry: Biotechnology
- Founded: 1971
- Defunct: 1991
- Fate: Merged with Chiron Corporation
- Headquarters: Emeryville, California
- Products: PCR, Betaseron, Proleukin,

Cetus Corporation was one of the first biotechnology companies. It was established in Berkeley, California, in 1971, but conducted most of its operations in nearby Emeryville. Before merging with Chiron Corporation in 1991 (now a part of Novartis), it developed several significant pharmaceutical drugs as well as a revolutionary DNA amplification technique.

== History ==
Cetus was founded in 1971 by Ronald E. Cape, Peter Farley, and Nobelist Donald A. Glaser. Its early efforts involved automated methods to select for industrial microorganisms that could produce greater amounts of chemical feedstocks, antibiotics, or vaccine components. By the late 1970s, however, three new revolutionary techniques had been developed: recombinant DNA, monoclonal antibodies, and gene expression, the foundations of the biotechnology industry. In order to enter these new fields, Cetus raised $108 million in an initial public offering (IPO) in 1981, the largest IPO to that date.

Its first large development project, in conjunction with Triton Biosciences, was the successful cloning, expression, modification, and production of beta-interferon. Unfortunately, the resultant protein did not live up to its expectations as a broad-spectrum anti-cancer drug, and only much later was it approved for use to treat symptoms of multiple sclerosis. The product is now sold under the name Betaseron.

The company's flagship product was Interleukin-2 (IL-2), an important modifier of the immune system. In the early 1980s, an intense competition to clone the gene for IL-2 was underway among Cetus, Genentech, Immunex, and the Japanese researcher, Tadatsugu Taniguchi, and in 1982 Taniguchi was the first to succeed. By 1983 Cetus created a proprietary recombinant version of IL2 and collaborated with Steven Rosenberg to begin clinical trials. The drug showed promising effects in treating renal cancer, but also had significant side effects on patients. In 1990 the U.S. Food and Drug Administration (FDA) refused to approve the drug for clinical use, asking for additional information. It wasn't until two years later, after Cetus had been sold, that IL-2 was approved. It is now distributed under the name Proleukin.

The company also had a broad effort to research and develop techniques for DNA diagnostics. Collaborations were made with Perkin-Elmer for diagnostic instruments, and with Kodak for commercial diagnostic kits. It was here that the technique of polymerase chain reaction (PCR) DNA amplification was conceived by Kary Mullis. The technique has been widely used in DNA research, forensics, and genetic disease diagnostics. Its inventor received the Nobel Prize in 1993, the only one awarded for research performed at a biotechnology company.

The delay in FDA approval for IL-2 created a major funding crisis at Cetus, which had been spending a considerable fraction of its investments to produce and test the drug. The company's CEO resigned six weeks later, and patent rights to the PCR process were sold to Hoffman-La Roche. Losses continued, and in 1991 the company was sold to Chiron Corporation. Chiron continued the development of IL-2, which was finally approved by the FDA in 1992. Chiron also collected the scattered rights for the production of beta-interferon, which was approved for clinical use in 1993.
