= Dot blot =

Technique for protein detection

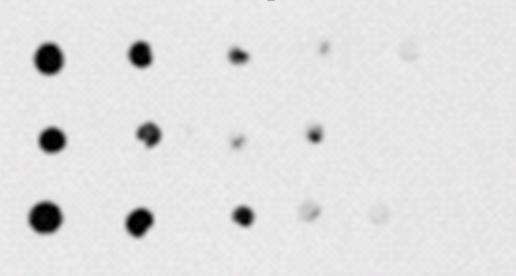
Typical dot blot membrane. Darker dots indicate more protein.

A dot blot (or slot blot) is a technique in molecular biology used to detect proteins. It represents a simplification of the western blot method, with the exception that the proteins to be detected are not first separated by electrophoresis. Instead, the sample is applied directly on a membrane in a single spot, and the blotting procedure is performed.

The technique offers significant savings in time, as chromatography or gel electrophoresis, and the complex blotting procedures for the gel are not required. However, it offers no information on the size of the target protein.

== Uses ==
Performing a dot blot is similar in idea to performing a western blot, with the advantage of faster speed and lower cost. Dot blots are also performed to screen the binding capabilities of an antibody.

== Methodology ==
A general dot blot protocol involves spotting 1–2 microliters of a samples onto a nitrocellulose or PVDF membrane and letting it air dry. Samples can be in the form of tissue culture supernatants, blood serum, cell extracts, or other preparations. After the protein samples are spotted onto the membrane, the membrane is placed in a plastic container and sequentially incubated in blocking buffer, antibody solutions, or rinsing buffer on shaker. After antibody binding, the membrane is incubated with a chemiluminescent substrate and imaged.

Vacuum-assisted dot blot apparatus has been used to facilitate the rinsing and incubating process by using vacuum to extract the solution from underneath the membrane, which is assembled in between several layers of plates to ensure good seal between sample wells, hold waste solution, and deliver suction force. For chemiluminescence signal detection, apparatus need to be disassembled and the membrane need to be taken out and wrapped in a transparent plastic film.

== See also ==
- ELISpot
- Western blot
