= Nucleic acid hybridization =

Phenomenon in molecular biology

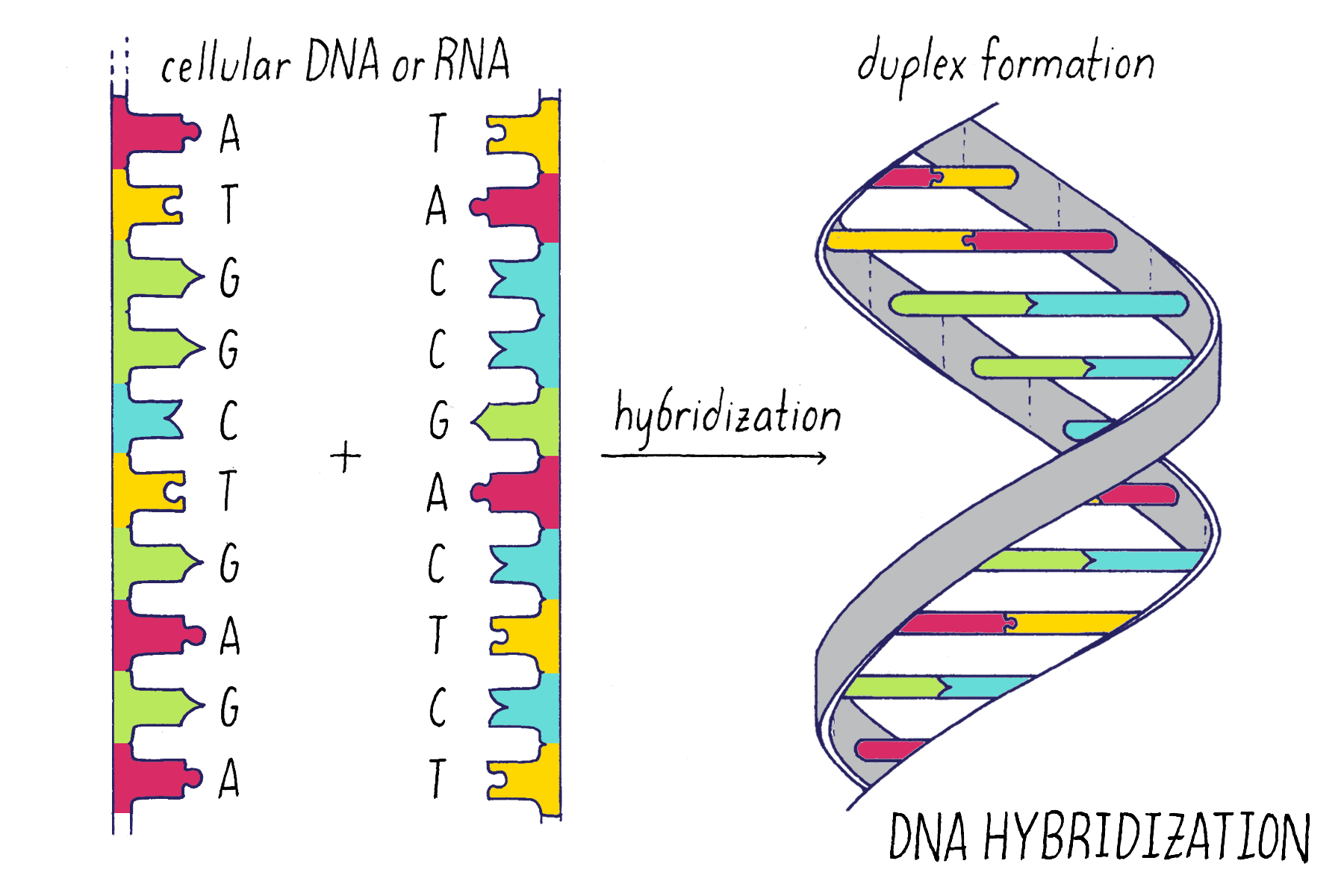
A reaction in which single-stranded DNA molecules are mixed and will “hybridize” to form a double helix if the bases of the strands are complementary.

In molecular biology, hybridization (or hybridisation) is a phenomenon in which single-stranded deoxyribonucleic acid (DNA) or ribonucleic acid (RNA) molecules anneal to complementary DNA or RNA. Though a double-stranded DNA sequence is generally stable under physiological conditions, changing these conditions in the laboratory (generally by raising the surrounding temperature) will cause the molecules to separate into single strands. These strands are complementary to each other but may also be complementary to other sequences present in their surroundings. Lowering the surrounding temperature allows the single-stranded molecules to anneal or “hybridize” to each other.

DNA replication and transcription of DNA into RNA both rely upon nucleotide hybridization, as do molecular biology techniques including Southern blots and Northern blots, the polymerase chain reaction (PCR), and most approaches to DNA sequencing.

== Applications ==
Hybridization is a basic property of nucleotide sequences and is taken advantage of in numerous molecular biology techniques. Overall, genetic relatedness of two species can be determined by hybridizing segments of their DNA (DNA–DNA hybridization). Due to sequence similarity between closely related organisms, higher temperatures are required to melt such DNA hybrids when compared to more distantly related organisms. A variety of different methods use hybridization to pinpoint the origin of a DNA sample, including the polymerase chain reaction (PCR). In another technique, short DNA sequences are hybridized to cellular mRNAs to identify expressed genes. Pharmaceutical drug companies are exploring the use of antisense RNA to bind to undesired mRNA, preventing the ribosome from translating the mRNA into protein.

=== Fluorescence In Situ Hybridization ===
Fluorescence in situ hybridization (FISH) is a laboratory method used to detect and locate a DNA sequence, often on a particular chromosome.

In the 1960s, researchers Joseph Gall and Mary Lou Pardue found that molecular hybridization could be used to identify the position of DNA sequences in situ (i.e., in their natural positions within a chromosome). In 1969, the two scientists published a paper demonstrating that radioactive copies of a ribosomal DNA sequence could be used to detect complementary DNA sequences in the nucleus of a frog egg. Since those original observations, many refinements have increased the versatility and sensitivity of the procedure to the extent that in situ hybridization is now considered an essential tool in cytogenetics.
