= List of bioinformatics companies =

This is a list of bioinformatics companies that have articles at Wikipedia:

- Applied Maths provides the software suite BioNumerics
- Astrid Research
- BIOBASE
- BioBam Bioinformatics creator of Blast2GO
- Biomax Informatics AG bioinformatics services.
- Biovia (formerly Accelrys).
- Chemical Computing Group MOE software for structural modelling
- CLC Bio Bioinformatics workbenches.
- Gene Codes Corporation
- Genedata software for data analysis and storage.
- GeneTalk web-based services.
- GenoCAD
- Genostar provides streamlined bioinformatics.
- Inte:Ligand
- Integromics
- Invitae
- Invitrogen creator of Vector NTI
- Leidos Biomedical Research Inc. formerly SAIC. Services are aimed at the Federal Government market.
- MacVector
- QIAGEN Silicon Valley (formerly Ingenuity Systems)
- Qlucore
- Phalanx Biotech Group
- Seqera Labs
- SimBioSys created the eHITS software
- SRA International services aimed at the Federal Government market.
- Strand Life Sciences
- TimeLogic offers DeCypher FPGA-accelerated BLAST, Smith-Waterman, HMMER and other sequence search tools.
