= List of genetic engineering software =

This article provides a list of genetic engineering software.

== Cloud-based freemium software ==
- Varstation NGS variants processing and analysis tool
- BaseSpace Variant Interpreter by Illumina

== Closed-source software ==
- VectorBee
- PeptiCloud
- BlueTractorSoftware DNADynamo
- Agilent Technologies RFLP Decoder Software, Fish Species
- Applied Biosystems GeneMapper
- Joint BioEnergy Institute j5
- CLC bio CLC DNA Workbench Software
- CLC bio CLC Free Workbench Software
- CLC bio CLC Sequence Viewer
- CLC bio Protein Workbench Software
- DNASTAR Lasergene
- Geneious
- LabVantage Solutions Inc. LabVantage Sapphire
- LabVantage Solutions Inc. LV LIMS
- Mega2
- SnapGene
- The GeneRecommender

== Open-source software ==
- Autodesk Genetic Constructor (suspended)
- BIOFAB Clotho BIOFAB Edition
- BIOFAB BIOFAB Studio
- EGF Codons and EGF CUBA (Collection of Useful Biological Apps) by the Edinburgh Genome Foundry
- Integrative Genomics Viewer (part of Google Genomics)
- Mengqvist's DNApy

== See also ==
- Geppetto (3D engine); an open-source 3D engine for genetic engineering-related functions;also used in the OpenWorm project
