= Genomic control =

Statistical method used in genetic association studies

Genomic control (GC) is a statistical method that is used to control for the confounding effects of population stratification in genetic association studies. The method was originally outlined by Bernie Devlin and Kathryn Roeder in a 1999 paper. It involves using a set of anonymous genetic markers to estimate the effect of population structure on the distribution of the chi-square statistic. The distribution of the chi-square statistics for a given allele that is suspected to be associated with a given trait can then be compared to the distribution of the same statistics for an allele that is expected not to be related to the trait. The method is supposed to involve the use of markers that are not linked to the marker being tested for a possible association. In theory, it takes advantage of the tendency of population structure to cause overdispersion of test statistics in association analyses. The genomic control method is as robust as family-based designs, despite being applied to population-based data. It has the potential to lead to a decrease in statistical power to detect a true association, and it may also fail to eliminate the biasing effects of population stratification. A more robust form of the genomic control method can be performed by expressing the association being studied as two Cochran–Armitage trend tests, and then applying the method to each test separately.

The assumption of population homogeneity in association studies, especially case-control studies, can easily be violated and can lead to both type I and type II errors. It is therefore important for the models used in the study to compensate for the population structure. The problem in case control studies is that if there is a genetic involvement in the disease, the case population is more likely to be related than the individuals in the control population. This means that the assumption of independence of observations is violated. Often this will lead to an overestimation of the significance of an association but it depends on the way the sample was chosen. If, coincidentally, there is a higher allele frequency in a subpopulation of the cases, you will find association with any trait that is more prevalent in the case population. This kind of spurious association increases as the sample population grows so the problem should be of special concern in large scale association studies when loci only cause relatively small effects on the trait. A method that in some cases can compensate for the above described problems has been developed by Devlin and Roeder (1999). It uses both a frequentist and a Bayesian approach (the latter being appropriate when dealing with a large number of candidate genes).

The frequentist way of correcting for population structure works by using markers that are not linked with the trait in question to correct for any inflation of the statistic caused by population structure. The method was first developed for binary traits but has since been generalized for quantitative ones. For the binary one, which applies to finding genetic differences between the case and control populations, Devlin and Roeder (1999) use Armitage's trend test

$$Y^2=\frac{N(N(r_1+2r_2)-R(n_1+2n_2))^2}{R(N-R)(N(n_1 + 4n_2) - (n_1 + 2n_2)^2)}$$

and the $\chi^2$ test for allelic frequencies

$$\chi^2\sim X_A^2 = \frac{2N (2N(r_1 + 2r_2) - R(n_1 + 2n_2))^2}
{4R(N - R) (2N(n_1 + 2n_2) - (n_1 + 2n_2)^2)}$$

Alleles	aa	Aa	AA	total
Case	r_{0}	r_{1}	r_{2}	R
Control	s_{0}	s_{1}	s_{2}	S
total	n_{0}	n_{1}	n_{2}	N

If the population is in Hardy–Weinberg equilibrium the two statistics are approximately equal. Under the null hypothesis of no population stratification the trend test is asymptotic $\chi^2$ distribution with one degree of freedom. The idea is that the statistic is inflated by a factor $\lambda$ so that $Y^2\sim\lambda\chi_1^2$ where $\lambda$ depends on the effect of stratification. The above method rests upon the assumptions that the inflation factor $\lambda$ is constant, which means that the loci should have roughly equal mutation rates, should not be under different selection in the two populations, and the amount of Hardy–Weinberg disequilibrium measured in Wright's coefficient of inbreeding F should not differ between the different loci. The last of these is of greatest concern. If the effect of the stratification is similar across the different loci $\lambda$ can be estimated from the unlinked markers

$$\widehat{\lambda}= \frac{\operatorname{median}(Y_1^2,Y_2^2,\ldots, Y_L^2)}{0.456}$$

where L is the number of unlinked markers. The denominator is derived from the gamma distribution as a robust estimator of $\lambda$. Other estimators have been suggested, for example, Reich and Goldstein suggested using the mean of the statistics instead. This is not the only way to estimate $\lambda$ but according to Bacanu et al. it is an appropriate estimate even if some of the unlinked markers are actually in disequilibrium with a disease causing locus or are themselves associated with the disease. Under the null hypothesis and when correcting for stratification using L unlinked genes, $Y^2$ is approximately $\chi^2_1$ distributed. With this correction the overall type I error rate should be approximately equal to $\alpha$ even when the population is stratified. Devlin and Roeder (1999) mostly considered the situation where $\alpha=0.05$ gives a 95% confidence level and not smaller p-values. Marchini et al. (2004) demonstrates by simulation that genomic control can lead to an anti-conservative p-value if this value is very small and the two populations (case and control) are extremely distinct. This was especially a problem if the number of unlinked markers were in the order 50−100. This can result in false positives (at that significance level).
