= Bruce Lindsay =

Bruce Lindsay may refer to:

- Bruce Lindsay (footballer) (born 1961), former Australian rules footballer
- Bruce Lindsay (broadcaster) (born 1950), news reporter with KSL TV in Salt Lake City
- Bruce G. Lindsay (1947–2015), American statistician

== See also ==
- Robert Bruce Lindsay (1900–1985), American physicist and physics professor
- Bruce Lindsey (born 1948), CEO of the William J. Clinton Foundation
