= Applied Maths =

Belgian biotechnology company

- Industry: Bioinformatics, Biotechnology
- Founded: 1992
- Headquarters: Sint-Martens-Latem, Belgium
- Products: BIONUMERICS, GelCompar II, BIONUMERICS Server
- Website: www.applied-maths.com

Applied Maths NV, a bioMérieux company headquartered in Sint-Martens-Latem, Belgium, is a bioinformatics company developing software for the biosciences.

== History ==
Applied Maths was founded in 1992 and gained worldwide recognition with the software GelCompar, used as a standard tool for the normalization and comparative analysis of electrophoresis patterns (PFGE, AFLP, RAPD, REP-PCR and variants, etc.).

GelCompar II was released in 1998 to deal with the ever growing amounts of information following the success and expansion of electrophoresis and other fingerprinting techniques in various application fields in microbiology, virology and mycology. Following the introduction of the concepts of polyphasic taxonomy and the growing need to combine genotypic, phenotypic, electrophoresis and sequence information, Applied Maths released in 1996 the software package BIONUMERICS which still today is a platform for the management, storage and (statistical) analysis of all types of biological data. BIONUMERICS and GelCompar II are used by several networks around the globe, such as PulseNet and CaliciNet, to share and identify strain information.

In January 2016, Applied Maths was acquired by bioMérieux. In October 2021, the company announced the phase out of its flagship software BIONUMERICS by the end 2024. Applied Maths merged with bioMérieux in June 2023.

== Products ==
BIONUMERICS: BIONUMERICS is a commercial suite of 4 configurations used for the analysis of all major applications in (microbial) bioinformatics: 1D electrophoresis gels, chromatographic and spectrometric profiles, phenotype characters, microarrays, nucleic acid sequences, whole genome sequences etc.

GelCompar II: GelCompar II is a suite of 5 modules developed for the analysis of fingerprint patterns, covering the normalization, import into a relational database and the comparative analysis.

BNServer: BNserver is the web-based platform generally installed between a centrally maintained database and distributed clients using BIONUMERICS, GelCompar II or a web browser to exchange biological information and analysis results. BNServer has been used since the nineties in Food outbreak detection.

EPISEQ CS: a cloud-based software for the analysis of clinical microbial outbreaks.

EPISEQ 16S: a cloud-based software for microbiome profiling studies based on the 16S rRNA gene.

EPISEQ SARS-CoV-2: a cloud-based software for the identification of SARS-CoV-2 variants.

== Reception ==
Over 20,000 peer-reviewed research articles mention the use of Applied Maths software packages BIONUMERICS or Gelcompar II.
