= Seqera Labs =

Bioinformatics company based in Barcelona

- Company type: Private
- Industry: Bioinformatics
- Founded: 2018
- Founders: Evan Floden, Paolo di Tommaso
- Headquarters: Barcelona, Spain
- Services: technologies for data pipelines
- Parent: Centre for Genomic Regulation (CRG)

Seqera Labs is a bioinformatics company developing technologies for data pipelines, founded in 2018 in Barcelona. It is a spin-off of the Centre for Genomic Regulation (CRG) founded by Evan Floden and Paolo di Tommaso and its services are largely related to the open-source software Nextflow, released in 2013.

In 2022, the company raised 22 million euros in Series A funding. It has also received several grants from the Chan Zuckerberg Initiative.
