= Jung-Ying Tzeng =

Taiwanese-American statistician

Jung-Ying Tzeng (Chinese: 曾仲瑩) is a Taiwanese and American statistician specializing in statistical genetics. She is a professor of statistics at North Carolina State University. Topics in her research have included applications of statistical genetics in understanding mental disorders, and the effects of haplotypes in the study of genetic associations.

== Education and career ==
Tzeng was a student at the National Taiwan University, where she earned a bachelor's degree in 1994, majoring in epidemiology in the Department of Public Health, and received a master's degree in biostatistics through the Graduate Institute of Epidemiology in 1997. Continuing her education in the United States at the Carnegie Mellon University Department of Statistics, she received a second master's degree in statistics in 2000 and completed her Ph.D. in 2003. Her dissertation, Identification of Mutations Affecting Liability to Complex Disease by the Analysis of Haplotypes, was supervised by Kathryn Roeder.

She joined North Carolina State University as an assistant professor of statistics, also affiliated with the Bioinformatics Research Center, in 2003. She added an affiliation with the Genomic Science Graduate Program in 2005. She was promoted to associate professor in 2010 and to full professor in 2016. Since 2016, she has also held visiting professor titles at National Cheng Kung University and National Taiwan University in Taiwan.

== Recognition ==
Tzeng was elected as a Fellow of the American Statistical Association in 2018.
