= Mara Dierssen Sotos =

Spanish neurobiologist (born 1961)

Mara Dierssen
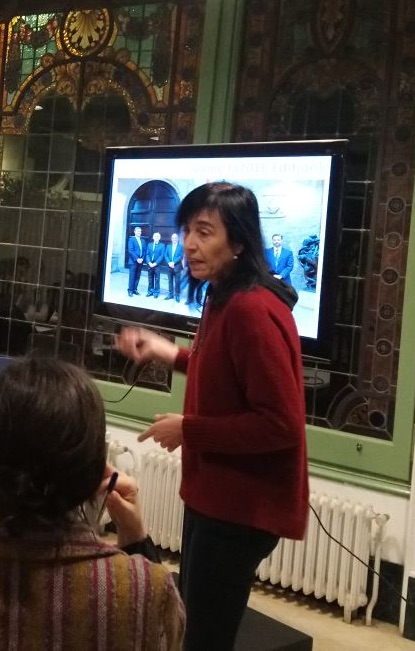
- Dierssen in 2018
- Born: Mara Dierssen Sotos; August 21, 1961 (age 65); Santander, Spain
- Education: University of Cantabria
- Known for: Research on the neurobiology of Down syndrome
- Scientific career
- Fields: Neurobiology; Neuroscience
- Workplaces: Centre for Genomic Regulation; Ramon Llull University; University of Cantabria

Mara Dierssen Sotos (born 21 August 1961) is a Spanish neurobiologist. She leads the Cellular and Systems Neurobiology group at the Centre for Genomic Regulation (CRG) in Barcelona and is regarded as one of the leading international researchers on the neurobiology of Down syndrome.

Her laboratory identified alterations of brain plasticity in animal models of Down syndrome and took a candidate compound from preclinical work through to a clinical trial, producing the first treatment shown to improve some cognitive functions in people with the condition. She has presided over the Spanish Society of Neuroscience, the International Behavioral and Neural Genetics Society and the Trisomy 21 Research Society, and led the organisation of the 2026 Federation of European Neuroscience Societies (FENS) Forum in Barcelona.

== Early life and education ==
Dierssen was born in Santander, in the region of Cantabria, the daughter of a painter and a neurosurgeon. She graduated in medicine from the University of Cantabria in 1985 and completed a doctorate in neurobiology at the same university in 1989, with a thesis in neuropharmacology.

== Career ==
After a research fellowship at the Free University of Berlin between 1989 and 1990, Dierssen carried out postdoctoral work at the Autonomous University of Barcelona from 1990 to 1993. She then returned to Cantabria as an assistant professor from 1993 to 1997, and from 1997 to 2001 held a research position at the Medical and Molecular Genetics Centre of the Institut de Recerca Oncològica in Barcelona. She has led her own group at the Centre for Genomic Regulation since 2001. In parallel she taught psychobiology at Ramon Llull University and collaborated in doctoral programmes at the Autonomous University of Barcelona and Pompeu Fabra University.

== Research ==
Dierssen's laboratory studies the neurobiology of learning and memory and how they are disrupted in brain disorders, with a particular focus on Down syndrome and the DYRK1A gene, which is present in three copies in trisomy 21. In 2016 she and María Victoria Sánchez-Vives jointly led a study in the Journal of Neuroscience showing that overexpression of Dyrk1A reduces excitability and impairs gamma oscillations in the prefrontal cortex.

=== Green tea extract trials ===
Because epigallocatechin gallate (EGCG), a compound found in green tea, inhibits the DYRK1A protein, Dierssen's group tested it first in mouse models and then in people. Together with the pharmacologist Rafael de la Torre of the Hospital del Mar Medical Research Institute, she was senior author of the TESDAD trial, a double-blind, placebo-controlled phase 2 study published in The Lancet Neurology in 2016. Conducted between June 2012 and June 2014 in 84 participants aged 16 to 34, it found that twelve months of EGCG combined with cognitive training was more effective than cognitive training alone at improving visual recognition memory, inhibitory control and adaptive behaviour. A paediatric trial in children aged 6 to 12 with Down syndrome and fragile X syndrome began recruiting in 2018 across five centres in Spain and France, supported by Dierssen's preclinical work. In a 2020 study in Scientific Reports she reported that EGCG combined with environmental enrichment restored more than 70% of the deregulated protein networks in a mouse model, pointing to an epigenetic mechanism.

=== Retrotransposons and lamivudine ===
In 2024, working with the IrsiCaixa institute, her group showed for the first time that retrotransposons are abnormally expressed in Down syndrome and that the antiretroviral drug lamivudine normalises the expression of several affected genes in a mouse model.

== Scientific societies ==
Dierssen was president of the Spanish Society of Neuroscience from 2013 to 2015 and has also presided over the International Behavioral and Neural Genetics Society. She was a founding member of the Trisomy 21 Research Society, created in 2014, and later served as its president. She has been a member of the executive committee of the Federation of European Neuroscience Societies, chaired the host society committee of the 2012 FENS Forum in Barcelona and was co-chair of the committee for the 2026 edition, held in the same city. In 2022 she was elected a numerary member of the Royal Academy of Medicine of Catalonia, and she also presides over the Spanish Brain Council.

== Awards and honours ==
- Jaime Blanco Prize, Down Syndrome Foundation of Madrid (twice)
- Ramón Trias Fargas Prize
- National Prize for Thought and Scientific Culture, Generalitat de Catalunya (2008)
- Sisley-Lejeune Award
- Selección Española de la Ciencia (2016)
- Silver medal and honorary membership of the Official College of Physicians of Cantabria

She is a member of the Academia Europaea and of the European Dana Alliance for the Brain, and a distinguished alumna of the University of Cantabria.
