= Finucane =

- Pronunciation: /fɪˈnuːkən/ fin-OO-kən
- Language: English

Origin
- Language: Irish
- Origin: Ó Fionnmhacáin
- Derivation: fionn 'fair, white' + the diminutive of mac 'son'
- Meaning: 'descendant of Fionnmhacán'

Finucane is an Irish surname and may refer to:

== People ==
- Al Finucane (born 1943), Irish football player
- Anne Finucane (born 1952), American banker
- Charles C. Finucane (1905–1983), American government official, and businessman
- Dale Finucane (born 1991), Australian rugby player
- Eddie Finucane (1916–1991), Australian rugby player
- Emma Finucane (born 2002), British track cyclist
- Hilary Finucane, American computational biologist
- John Finucane (born 1980), Irish politician
- John Finucane (Limerick politician) (1843–1902), Irish politician
- Kirsten Finucane, New Zealand pediatric cardiologist
- Marian Finucane (1950–2020), Irish broadcaster
- Matthias Finucane (1737–1814), Irish judge
- Michael Finucane (born 1943), Irish politician
- Mick Finucane (1922–2016), Irish football player
- Moira Finucane, Australian actor
- Paddy Finucane (1920–1942), British RAF fighter pilot and flying ace
- Pat Finucane (1949–1989), Irish human rights lawyer killed by loyalist paramilitaries
- Patrick Finucane (Irish politician) (1890–1984), Irish politician
- William S. Finucane (1888–1951), American politician and businessman

== Others ==
- Finucane Island, an island in the Pilbara region of Western Australia
- Pat Finucane Centre (PFC), a human rights advocacy and lobbying entity in Northern Ireland
