= Integromics =

Bioinformatics company

Integromics SL
- Type: Private company
- Industry: Biotechnology
- Founded: 2002
- Founder: Jose Maria Carazo, Alberto D. Pascual, Vicente Rodriguez
- Fate: Acquired by PerkinElmer in 2017
- Headquarters: Granada, Spain

Integromics was a global bioinformatics company headquartered in Granada, Spain and Madrid. The company had subsidiaries in the United States and United Kingdom, and distributors in 10 countries. Integromics specialised in bioinformatics software for data management and data analysis in genomics and proteomics. The company provided a line of products that serve gene expression, sequencing, and proteomics markets. Customers included genomic research centers, pharmaceutical companies, academic institutions, clinical research organizations, and biotechnology companies.

Integromics was acquired by PerkinElmer in 2017.

== History ==
Integromics was founded in 2002 as a spin-off of the National Center for Biotechnology (CNB / CSIC) in Spain and the University of Malaga. Principal founder Dr. Jose Maria Carazo was motivated by a market need to develop new computational methods for analyzing data, with the company's first product addressing the needs of the microarray data analysis market.

- 2007 Integromics partners with Applied Biosystems
- 2007 Integromics Inc. Establishes US Office at Philadelphia Science Center
- 2008 Integromics partners with TIBCO Spotfire to develop Integromics Biomarker Discovery
- 2009 Integromics partners with Ingenuity to offer integration for Comprehensive Genomics Analysis
- 2009 Integromics forms part of the PROACTIVE consortium to develop a unique high throughput plasma biomarker research platform
- 2009 Integromics releases its first proteomics product
- 2009 Integromics received a venture investment of 1M€ from I + D Unifondo
- 2010 Integromics and TATAA Biocenter collaborate to offer comprehensive qPCR data analysis
- 2010 Integromics releases its first Next Generation Sequencing Analysis product
- 2010 Integromics publication in Nature describes new class of gene-termini-associated human RNAs suggests a novel RNA copying mechanism, achieved using Integromics SeqSolve™ Next Generation Sequencing software
- 2011 Integromics and Ingenuity expand their co-operation with the integration of a fourth Integromics product to Ingenuity's IPA
- 2011 Integromics launches OmicsHub Proteomics 2.0, a data management and analysis tool for mass spectrometry laboratories and core facilities
- 2011 Integromics publication in Mol Cell Proteomics describes Multiplexed homogeneous proximity ligation assays for high-throughput protein biomarker research in serological material.
- 2011 Integromics publication in Cell describes novel polyadenylation genome-wide profiling, achieved using Integromics SeqSolve™ Next Generation Sequencing software
- 2012 Integromics partners with FPGMX to develop low-cost methods for clinical genomics
- 2012 Tibco Spotfire Certifies Integromics as its Sole Partner in the Fields of Genomics, Proteomics and Bioinformatics
- 2012 Integromics Launches OmicsOffice Platform, a total service that provides a streamlined and common analysis environment to analyse results from different genomics technologies and the analytical tools to compare and achieve a higher level of results using these combinations
- 2013 Integromics partners with PerkinElmer for the Exclusive Worldwide Distributorship of New Omics Office Genomics Software from Integromics
- 2013 Integromics partners with the Celgene Institute for Translational Research Europe (CITRE) and the Centre of Studies and Technical Research (CEIT) to implement the SANSCRIPT project
- 2013 Integromics establishes a Key Collaboration with European HPC Experts to Develop New Big-data Computing Services for Genomics
- 2017 Acquired by PerkinElmer

== Partners ==
Integromics collaborated with international technology providers such as Applied Biosystems, Ingenuity, Spotfire, pharmaceutical companies, and academic institutions.

- RESOLVE. Resolve chronic inflammation and achieve healthy ageing by understanding non-regenerative repair
- LIPIDOMIC NET. Lipid droplets as dynamic organelles of fat deposition and release: translational research towards human disease. It is managed within the EU FP7, in close collaboration with LIPID MAPS and Lipid Bank.
- PROACTIVE. High throughput proteomics systems for accelerated profiling of putative plasma biomarkers.
- ProteomeXchange. Coordination action to establish proteomics standards. Coordinated by the European Bioinformatics Institute
- IRIS. Integrated computational environment for high throughput RNA Interference Screening. Coordinated by Integromics.

== Awards and recognition ==
- 2007 - Frost & Sullivan Product Innovation of the Year Award
- 2007 - Emprendedor XXI Innovation Award
- 2010 - Accésit of Premio Sello Innovación Award
- 2011 - "Best Trajectory of a Technology-Based Innovative Enterprise (EIBT) 2011" Award
- 2012 - Award of the Tech Media Europe 2012 & ICT Finance MarketPlace

== Products and services ==
=== SeqSolve ===
SeqSolve is software for the tertiary analysis of Next Generation Sequencing (NGS) data.

=== RealTime StatMiner ===
RealTime StatMiner is a Step-by-Step Guide for RT-qPCR data analysis. RealTime StatMiner is available as a standalone as well as a TIBCO Spotfire compatible application. Co-developed with Applied Biosystems.

=== Integromics Biomarker Discovery ===
Integromics Biomarker Discovery (IBD) for microarray gene expression data analysis guides the user throughout a step-by-step workflow.

=== OmicsHub Proteomics ===
OmicsHub® Proteomics is a platform for the central management and analysis of data in proteomics labs.

== See also ==
- List of bioinformatics companies
- Bioinformatics
- Computational Biology
- Microarray analysis
- DNA Microarray
- Pathway Analysis
- Proteomics
- Gene expression
- DNA sequencing
