= YFG =

YFG may refer to:

- Yari Film Group
- Young Fine Gael
- Your Favorite Gene
