= BioBam Bioinformatics =

Bioinformatics software company

BioBam Bioinformatics S.L.
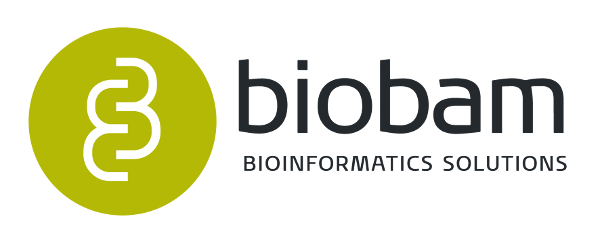
- Type: Privately held company
- Industry: Bioinformatics
- Founded: 2011
- Founder: Stefan Götz, Ana Conesa
- Headquarters: Valencia, Spain
- Area served: Worldwide
- Key people: Stefan Götz (CEO, founder)
- Products: Blast2GO
- Services: CloudBlast
- Website: https://biobam.com

BioBam is a bioinformatics software company located in Valencia, Spain selling software for the analysis of biological data. Its products are used by public and private research organizations around the world. The firm was founded in 2011 by Dr. Stefan Götz and Dr. Ana Conesa. The managing director of BioBam is Dr. Stefan Götz.

== Products ==
The firm develops and provides products for the functional annotation and analysis of genomics data sets. The most well-known product is Blast2GO; the paper describing it has been cited by over 3528 scientific citations (as of January, 2016). Blast2GO is for functional genomics specially for non-model organism research. Blast2GO is for functional annotation of novel sequences and the genome-wide analysis of annotation data. BioBam has partnerships with bioinformatics companies like CLC bio and Biomatters, among others.
