= Isabelle Vernos =

Biochemist specialized in microtubules

Isabelle Vernos is an ICREA research professor at the Center for Genomic Regulation in Barcelona. She received a PhD in biochemistry from the Autonomous University of Madrid followed by postdoctoral studies at Cambridge University. Between 1992 and 2005 she developed her research career at the European Molecular Biology Laboratory at the University of Heidelberg in Germany. Since 2005 she is an ICREA Research Professor at the Center for Genomic Regulation in Barcelona where she leads the group on Microtubule Function and Cell Division, the same year she also became a member of the European Molecular Biology Laboratory. In 2012 she was chosen to be part of the Spanish Secretary of State Advisory Council on Science, Technology and Innovation, an institution formed by scientists and social agencies to advise on development policies and scientific innovation and where she is the only woman. Since 2014 she has been a member of the scientific council of the European Research Council, the institution responsible for promoting high-level research in Europe.
