= Population structure (genetics) =

Stratification of a genetic population based on allele frequencies

Population structure (also called genetic structure) is the presence of a systematic differences in allele frequencies between subpopulations of the same species. The enclosing group of several subpopulations is referred to as a metapopulation. In a randomly mating (or panmictic) population, allele frequencies are expected to be roughly similar between groups at a given point in time. However, mating is never perfectly random in natural populations, thus structure arises even in geographically unobstructed groups. Additionally, ecological barriers such as rivers or canyons may sequester subpopulations and make mating between them less likely, resulting in reproductive isolation. As long as this isolation remains, new mutations and changes in the frequencies of existing alleles (i.e. evolution) plays out separately in each group, causing divergence. Over many generations, a post-isolation allele may increase to the point of being found in all individuals of one group (reaching fixation), while being completely absent in the other. In this way, population structure can be considered as an early phase in the process of speciation.

Genetic variants may be neutral (no change in fitness) or even entirely silent, resulting in no functional changes to an individual all, but may nevertheless be statistically correlated with some observed outcome by coincidence because of population structure. For example, a neutral variant that is common in a closely related population facing a high rate of some disease may erroneously be thought to cause the disease. For very closely related populations, many neutral variants may match or even exceed the rate of the actually pathogenic allele. For this reason, population structure is a common and powerfully confounding variable in medical genetics studies, and methods to control for it are critical in genome wide association studies (GWAS). By tracing the origins of structure, it is also possible to study the genetic ancestry of groups and individuals.

== Description ==
Ultimately, the basic driver of population structure in sexually reproducing species is non-random mating between groups: if all individuals within a population mate randomly, then the allele frequencies should be similar between groups. Population structure commonly arises from physical separation by distance or barriers, like mountains and rivers, followed by genetic drift. Other causes include gene flow from migrations, population bottlenecks and expansions, founder effects, evolutionary pressure, random chance, and (in humans) cultural factors. Even in lieu of these factors, individuals tend to stay close to where they were born, which means that alleles will not be distributed at random with respect to the full range of the species.

== Measures ==
Population structure is a complex phenomenon and no single measure captures it entirely. Understanding a population's structure requires a combination of methods and measures. Many statistical methods rely on simple population models in order to infer historical demographic changes, such as the presence of population bottlenecks, admixture events or population divergence times. Often these methods rely on the assumption of panmictia, or homogeneity in an ancestral population. Misspecification of such models, for instance by not taking into account the existence of structure in an ancestral population, can give rise to heavily biased parameter estimates. Simulation studies show that historical population structure can even have genetic effects that can easily be misinterpreted as historical changes in population size, or the existence of admixture events, even when no such events occurred.

=== Heterozygosity ===
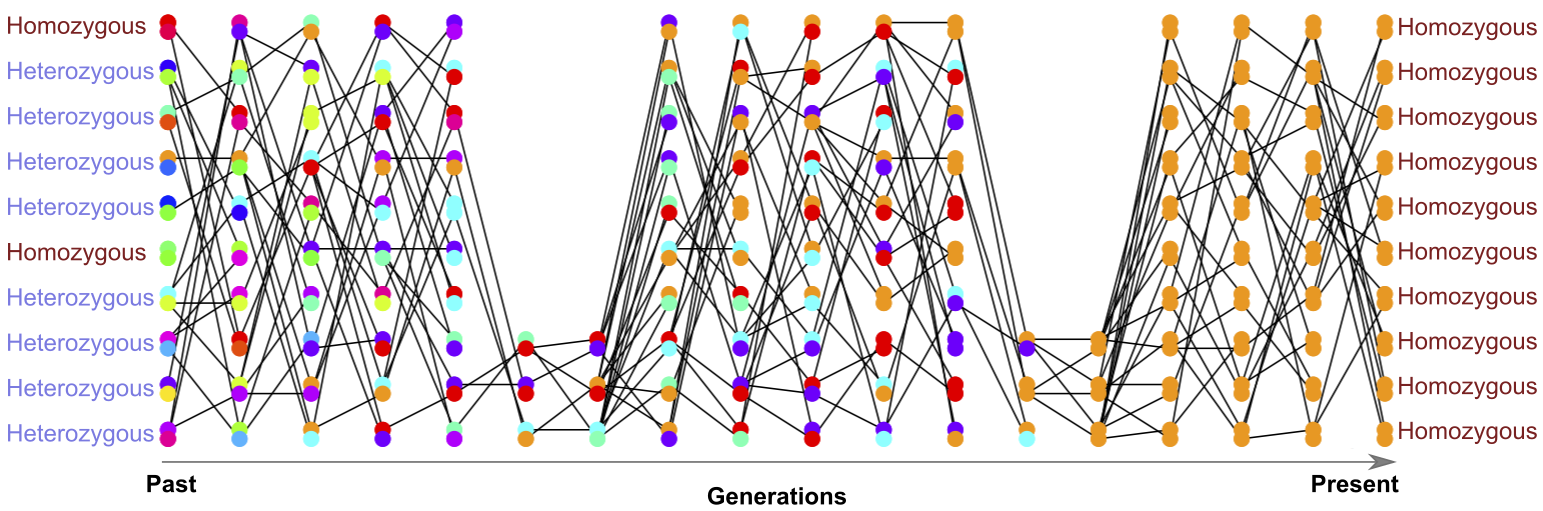
A population bottleneck can result in a loss of heterozygosity. In this hypothetical population, an allele has become fixed after the population repeatedly dropped from 10 to 3.

One of the results of population structure is a reduction in heterozygosity. When populations split, alleles have a higher chance of reaching fixation within subpopulations, especially if the subpopulations are small or have been isolated for long periods. This reduction in heterozygosity can be thought of as an extension of inbreeding, with individuals in subpopulations being more likely to share a recent common ancestor. The scale is important — an individual with both parents born in the United Kingdom is not inbred relative to that country's population, but is more inbred than two humans selected from the entire world. This motivates the derivation of Wright's F-statistics (also called "fixation indices"), which measure inbreeding through observed versus expected heterozygosity. For example, $F_{IS}$ measures the inbreeding coefficient at a single locus for an individual $I$ relative to some subpopulation $S$:

$$F_{IS} = 1 - \frac{H_I}{H_S}$$

Here, $H_I$ is the fraction of individuals in subpopulation $S$ that are heterozygous. Assuming there are two alleles, $A_1, A_2$ that occur at respective frequencies $p_S, q_S$, it is expected that under random mating the subpopulation $S$ will have a heterozygosity rate of $H_S = 2p_S(1-p_S) = 2 p_S q_S$. Then:

$$F_{IS} = 1 - \frac{H_I}{2 p_S q_S}$$

Similarly, for the total population $T$, we can define $H_T = 2 p_T q_T$ allowing us to compute the expected heterozygosity of subpopulation $S$ and the value $F_{ST}$ as:

$$F_{ST} = 1 - \frac{H_S}{H_T} = 1 - \frac{2p_S q_S}{2 p_T q_T}$$

If F is 0, then the allele frequencies between populations are identical, suggesting no structure. The theoretical maximum value of 1 is attained when an allele reaches total fixation, but most observed maximum values are far lower. F_{ST} is one of the most common measures of population structure and there are several different formulations depending on the number of populations and the alleles of interest. Although it is sometimes used as a genetic distance between populations, it does not always satisfy the triangle inequality and thus is not a metric. It also depends on within-population diversity, which makes interpretation and comparison difficult.

=== Admixture inference ===
An individual's genotype can be modelled as an admixture between K discrete clusters of populations. Each cluster is defined by the frequencies of its genotypes, and the contribution of a cluster to an individual's genotypes is measured via an estimator. In 2000, Jonathan K. Pritchard introduced the STRUCTURE algorithm to estimate these proportions via Markov chain Monte Carlo, modelling allele frequencies at each locus with a Dirichlet distribution. Since then, algorithms such as ADMIXTURE (developed by David Alexander and colleagues at the University of California, Los Angeles) have been developed using different and improved estimation techniques. Estimated proportions can be visualized using bar plots — each bar represents an individual, and is subdivided to represent the proportion of an individual's genetic ancestry from one of the K populations.

Varying K can illustrate different scales of population structure; using a small K for the entire human population will subdivide people roughly by continent, while using large K will partition populations into finer subgroups. Though clustering methods are popular, they are open to misinterpretation: for non-simulated data, there is never a "true" value of K, but rather an approximation considered useful for a given question. They are sensitive to sampling strategies, sample size, and close relatives in data sets; there may be no discrete populations at all; and there may be hierarchical structure where subpopulations are nested. Clusters may be admixed themselves, and may not have a useful interpretation as source populations.

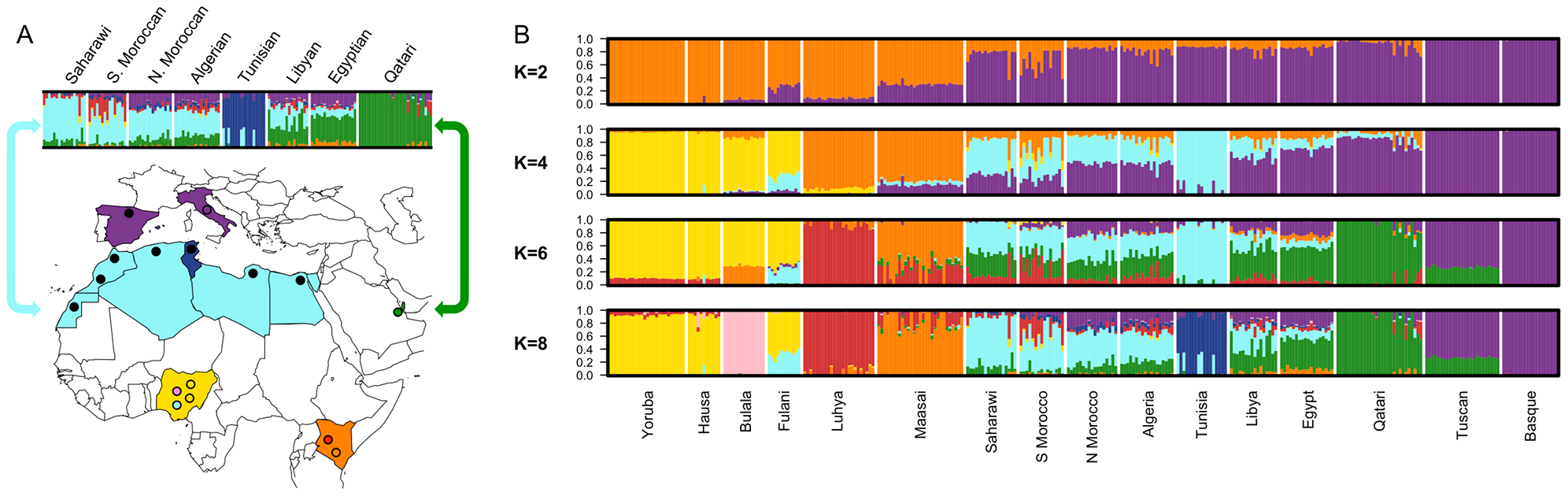
A study of population structure of humans in Northern Africa and neighboring populations modelled using ADMIXTURE and assuming K=2,4,6,8 populations (Figure B, top to bottom). Varying K changes the scale of clustering. At K=2, 80% of the inferred ancestry for most North Africans is assigned to cluster that is common to Basque, Tuscan, and Qatari Arab individuals (in purple). At K=4, clines of North African ancestry appear (in light blue). At K=6, opposite clines of Near Eastern (Qatari) ancestry appear (in green). At K=8, Tunisian Berbers appear as a cluster (in dark blue).

=== Dimensionality reduction ===
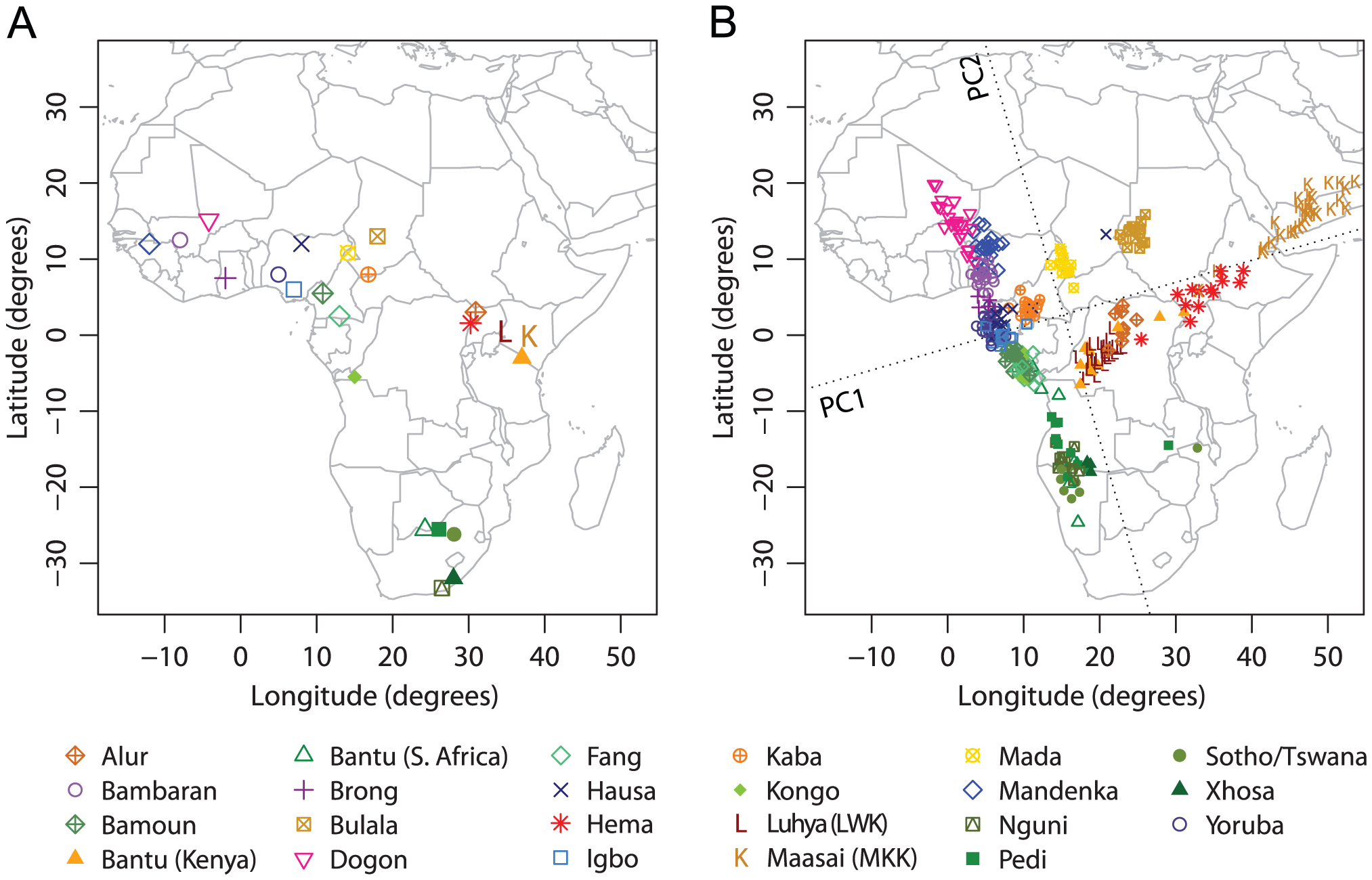
A map of the locations of genetic samples of several African populations (left) and principal components 1 and 2 of the data superimposed on the map (right). The principal coordinate plane has been rotated 16.11° to align with the map. It corresponds to the east–west and north–south distributions of the populations.

Genetic data are high dimensional and dimensionality reduction techniques can capture population structure. Principal component analysis (PCA) was first applied in population genetics in 1978 by Cavalli-Sforza and colleagues and resurged with high-throughput sequencing. Initially PCA was used on allele frequencies at known genetic markers for populations, though later it was found that by coding SNPs as integers (for example, as the number of non-reference alleles) and normalizing the values, PCA could be applied at the level of individuals. One formulation considers $N$ individuals and $S$ bi-allelic SNPs. For each individual $i$, the value at locus $l$ is $g_{i,l}$ is the number of non-reference alleles (one of $0, 1, 2$). If the allele frequency at $l$ is $p_{l}$, then the resulting $N \times S$ matrix of normalized genotypes has entries:

$$\frac{g_{i,l} - 2p_{l}}{\sqrt{2p_{l} (1-p_{l})}}$$

PCA transforms data to maximize variance; given enough data, when each individual is visualized as point on a plot, discrete clusters can form. Individuals with admixed ancestries will tend to fall between clusters, and when there is homogenous isolation by distance in the data, the top PC vectors will reflect geographic variation. The eigenvectors generated by PCA can be explicitly written in terms of the mean coalescent times for pairs of individuals, making PCA useful for inference about the population histories of groups in a given sample. PCA cannot, however, distinguish between different processes that lead to the same mean coalescent times.

Multidimensional scaling and discriminant analysis have been used to study differentiation, population assignment, and to analyze genetic distances. Neighborhood graph approaches like t-distributed stochastic neighbor embedding (t-SNE) and uniform manifold approximation and projection (UMAP) can visualize continental and subcontinental structure in human data. With larger datasets, UMAP better captures multiple scales of population structure; fine-scale patterns can be hidden or split with other methods, and these are of interest when the range of populations is diverse, when there are admixed populations, or when examining relationships between genotypes, phenotypes, and/or geography. Variational autoencoders can generate artificial genotypes with structure representative of the input data, though they do not recreate linkage disequilibrium patterns.

== Demographic inference ==
Population structure is an important aspect of evolutionary and population genetics. Events like migrations and interactions between groups leave a genetic imprint on populations. Admixed populations will have haplotype chunks from their ancestral groups, which gradually shrink over time because of recombination. By exploiting this fact and matching shared haplotype chunks from individuals within a genetic dataset, researchers may trace and date the origins of population admixture and reconstruct historic events such as the rise and fall of empires, slave trades, colonialism, and population expansions.

== Role in genetic epidemiology ==
Population structure can be a problem for association studies, such as case-control studies, where the association between the trait of interest and locus could be incorrect. As an example, in a study population of Europeans and East Asians, an association study of chopstick usage may "discover" a gene in the Asian individuals that leads to chopstick use. However, this is a spurious relationship as the genetic variant is simply more common in Asians than in Europeans. Also, actual genetic findings may be overlooked if the locus is less prevalent in the population where the case subjects are chosen. For this reason, it was common in the 1990s to use family-based data where the effect of population structure can easily be controlled for using methods such as the transmission disequilibrium test (TDT).

Phenotypes (measurable traits), such as height or risk for heart disease, are the product of some combination of genes and environment. These traits can be estimated using polygenic scores, which seek to isolate and estimate the contribution of genetics to a trait by summing the effects of many individual genetic variants. To construct a score, researchers first enroll participants in an association study to estimate the contribution of each genetic variant. Then, they can use the estimated contributions of each genetic variant to calculate a score for the trait for an individual who was not in the original association study. If structure in the study population is correlated with environmental variation, then the polygenic score is no longer measuring the genetic component alone.

Several methods can at least partially control for this confounding effect. The genomic control method was introduced in 1999 and is a relatively nonparametric method for controlling the inflation of test statistics. It is also possible to use unlinked genetic markers to estimate each individual's ancestry proportions from some K subpopulations, which are assumed to be unstructured. More recent approaches make use of principal component analysis (PCA), as demonstrated by Alkes Price and colleagues, or by deriving a genetic relationship matrix (also called a kinship matrix) and including it in a linear mixed model (LMM).

PCA and LMMs have become the most common methods to control for confounding from population structure. Though they are likely sufficient for avoiding false positives in association studies, they are still vulnerable to overestimating effect sizes of marginally associated variants and can substantially bias estimates of polygenic scores and trait heritability. If environmental effects are related to a variant that exists in only one specific region (for example, a pollutant is found in only one city), it may not be possible to correct for this population structure effect at all. For many traits, the role of structure is complex and not fully understood, and incorporating it into genetic studies remains a challenge and is an active area of research.
