= TimeLogic =

- Company type: Privately held company
- Industry: Bioinformatics Hardware and Software
- Founded: 1981
- Headquarters: Carlsbad, CA, USA
- Area served: Worldwide
- Products: DeCypher, Tera-BLAST, DeCypherSW, DeCypherHMM, GeneDetective, PipeWorks
- Parent: Active Motif, Inc.
- Website: www.timelogic.com

TimeLogic was the bioinformatics division of Active Motif, Inc. The company is headquartered in Carlsbad, California. TimeLogic developed FPGA-accelerated tools for biological sequence comparison in the field of high performance bioinformatics and biocomputing.

== History ==
TimeLogic was founded in 1981 by James W. (Jim) Lindelien and developed one of the first commercial hardware-accelerated tools for bioinformatics, an FPGA-accelerated version of the Smith-Waterman algorithm. TimeLogic's DeCypher systems have expanded to provide accelerated implementations of the ubiquitous bioinformatics algorithms BLAST, Smith-Waterman, and HMMER using field programmable gate array (FPGA) technology.

In 2003, TimeLogic was acquired by Active Motif, a biotechnology reagent company started by Invitrogen co-founder Joseph Fernandez.

In 2008, TimeLogic formed a partnership with Biomatters to integrate Geneious Pro with the accelerated algorithms on DeCypher systems.

In 2011, TimeLogic formed a partnership with Bielefeld University's Center for Biotechnology (CeBiTec) to jointly develop accelerated computational tools.

== Selected scientific contributions ==
Accelerated bioinformatics algorithms have played an important role in high throughput genomics, and DeCypher systems have been widely published as an enabling technology for genomic discovery in over 180 peer-reviewed scientific research articles, including the selected milestones below:

In 1997, the annotation of the first complete sequence of the E. coli K12 genome used DeCypher Smith-Waterman to determine the function of new translated sequences.

In 2002, the rice genome, the first completely sequenced crop, was annotated using DeCypher FrameSearch "to detect and guide the correction of frameshifts caused by indels."

In 2004, a high throughput genomic approach to the study of horizontal gene transfer in plant-parasitic nematodes was conducted using DeCypher Tera-BLAST, Timelogic's implementation of the BLAST algorithm.

In 2007, HMM profiling of metagenomics sequences generated by the Sorcerer II Global Ocean Sampling Expedition (GOS) were performed using DeCypherHMM to discover 1700 new protein families and matches to 6000 sequences previously categorized in scientific literature as ORFans. Dr. Craig Venter credited TimeLogic in his biography, noting that the DeCypher system performed "an order of magnitude or two more than had been achieved before. The final computation took two weeks but would have run for well more than a century on a standard computer."

Also in 2007, a physical map of the soybean pathogen Fusarium virguliforme was developed using exonic fragments identified with DeCypher GeneDetective.

In 2011, a global assessment of the genomic variation in cattle was conducted using DeCypher Tera-BLAST "to accurately detect chromosomal positions of the SNP sites."

== Products ==
- DeCypher Server is a high performance server with the DeCypher Similarity Search Engine FPGA-based accelerator that can be reprogrammed on the fly to run all of TimeLogic's accelerated search algorithms.
- Tera-BLAST is an accelerated BLAST algorithm implementation, which includes Tera-BLASTN, Tera-BLASTP, Tera-BLASTX, Tera-TBLASTN, and Tera-TBLASTX. Tera-BLAST also includes Tera-Probe, a proprietary algorithm for probe design.
- DeCypher Smith-Waterman is an accelerated Smith-Waterman algorithm implementation, which also includes FrameSearch.
- DeCypherHMM is an accelerated HMMER algorithm implementation, which also includes HFST, a frameshift tolerant HMM search.
- GeneDetective is an accelerated implementation similar to Ewan Birney's GeneWise for discovery of genes, intron, exons, and splice sites in eukaryotic genomes.
- PipeWorks is a drag-and-drop graphical interface for the design of accelerated bioinformatics pipelines.

== See also ==
- List of bioinformatics companies
