= Biomax =

Biomax Informatics is a Munich-based software company.

Biomax can also refer to:

- Biomax Procurement Services, a fake biomedical research company
- Gasolineras Uno, known as Gasolineras Biomax in Colombia
