= Bernie Devlin =

American psychiatrist

- Born: Bernard J. Devlin
- Education: Pennsylvania State University
- Known for: Genetics of autism Psychiatric genetics Statistical genetics
- Spouse: Kathryn Roeder
- Children: Summer Devlin
- Awards: Fellow of the American Association for the Advancement of Science
- Scientific career
- Fields: Psychiatry
- Workplaces: Yale University School of Medicine; University of Pittsburgh
- Thesis: Studies on the female and male reproductive functions with a hermaphroditic species, Lobelia cardinalis (1986)

Bernard J. Devlin is an American psychiatrist who is Professor of Psychiatry and Clinical and Translational Science at the University of Pittsburgh. An expert on statistical and psychiatric genetics, he is a fellow of the statistics section of the American Association for the Advancement of Science. He is also a member of the American Society of Human Genetics, the Genetics Society of America, and the International Society for Autism Research. Before joining the faculty of the University of Pittsburgh, he worked at the Yale School of Medicine, where he conducted research with Neil Risch on the utility of DNA tests. He is married to Kathryn Roeder, a professor at Carnegie Mellon University, with whom he often collaborates on research. Topics that Devlin and Roeder have studied together include the genetic basis of autism. Devlin and Roeder have a daughter, Summer.
