= Your Favorite Gene =

- Developer: Sigma-Aldrich Corp
- Website: sigmaaldrich.com/.../your-favorite-gene...

Your Favorite Gene is a dynamic web-based research tool provided by Sigma-Aldrich Corp and powered by Ingenuity Systems' Knowledge Base, a repository of biological and chemical networks that is the largest database of its kind. Biological pathways, metabolic pathways, and gene interaction networks are available. The tool was initially released in 2007.

The tool allows users to search for genes, protein, function, disease, species, tissue, or pathway and match them with 150,000 shRNAs, 725,000 siRNAs, 8,000 antibodies, proteins and kits, and 1,000 bioactive small molecules within the context of their research. Using a dynamic interface, the user is then able to model and evaluate experimental procedures based on previously published findings.

In 2009, Your Favorite Gene received the CIO 100 Award for Innovative Web Research Tool.
