= Mega2, the Manipulation Environment for Genetic Analysis =

Statistical genetics software

Mega2
- Original authors: Previous Programmers: Charles P. Kollar, Nandita Mukhopadhyay, Lee Almasy, Mark Schroeder, William P. Mulvihill.
- Developers: Daniel E. Weeks, Robert V. Baron, Justin R. Stickel.
- Release: 16 January 2000; 26 years ago
- Stable release: 6.0.0 / 13 December 2018; 7 years ago
- Written in: C++
- Operating system: Linux, Mac OS X, Microsoft Windows
- Type: Applied statistical genetics, Bioinformatics
- License: GNU General Public License version 3
- Website: sites.pitt.edu/~weeks/mega2.html
- Repository: github.com/DanielEWeeks/mega2

Mega2 is a data manipulation software for applied statistical genetics. Mega is an acronym for Manipulation Environment for Genetic Analysis.

The software allows the applied statistical geneticist to convert one's data from several input formats to a large number output formats suitable for analysis by commonly used software packages. In a typical human genetics study, the analyst often needs to use a variety of different software programs to analyze the data, and these programs usually require that the data be formatted to their precise input specifications. Conversion of one's data into these multiple different formats can be tedious, time-consuming, and error-prone. Mega2, by providing validated conversion pipelines, can accelerate the analyses while reducing errors.

Mega2 produces a common intermediate data representation using SQLite3, which enables the data to be accessed by other programs and languages. In particular, the Mega2R R package converts the SQLite3 data into R data frames. Several R functions are provided that illustrate how data can be extracted from the data frames for common R analysis, such as SKAT and pedgene. The key is being able to efficiently extract genotypes corresponding to chosen subsets of markers so as to facilitate gene-based association testing by automating looping over genes in the genome. Another function converts to VCF format and another converts the data to GenABEL format. For more information about the Mega2R package, see here.

Mega2 has been used to facilitate genetic analyses of a wide variety of human traits, including hereditary dystonia, Ehlers–Danlos syndrome, multiple sclerosis, and gliomas. A list of PubMed Central articles citing Mega2 can be seen here.

Mega2, which focusses on data reformatting, should not be confused with the MEGA, Molecular Evolutionary Genetics Analysis program, which focuses on molecular evolution and phylogenetics.

== Input file formats ==
Mega2 accepts input data in a variety of widely used file formats. These contain, at a minimum, data about the phenotypes, the marker genotypes, any family structures, and map positions of the markers.

Input format	Description	Links
LINKAGE	pre-Makeped or post-Makeped formats	Linkage User Guide (PDF), LINKAGE format
Mega2	simplified/augmented LINKAGE-format	Mega2 format
PLINK	ped format or binary bed format	PLINK documentation
VCF or BCF	Variant Call Format or Binary Variant Call Format	Variant Call Format (Wikipedia entry), BCF documentation
IMPUTE2	IMPUTE2 GEN and BGEN Formats	IMPUTE2 documentation, GEN format, BGEN format

== Output file formats ==
Mega2 supports conversion to the following output formats.

Output format	Links
ASPEX format	ASPEX
Allegro format	
Beagle format	BEAGLE
CRANEFOOT format	CRANEFOOT
Eigenstrat format	EIGENSOFT
FBAT format	FBAT
GeneHunter format	GeneHunter
GeneHunter-Plus format	GeneHunter-Plus
IQLS/Idcoefs format	IQLS, Idcoefs
Linkage format	Linkage User Guide (PDF), LINKAGE format
Loki format	Loki
MaCH/minimac3 format	MaCH, minimac3
MLBQTL format	MLB-QTL
Mega2 annotated format	Mega2 format
Mendel format	Mendel
Merlin format	Merlin
Merlin/SimWalk2-NPL format	Merlin SimWalk2
PANGAEA MORGAN format	MORGAN
PAP format	PAP
PLINK format (bed, lgen, or ped formats)	PLINK
PREST format	PREST
PSEQ format	PSEQ
Pre-makeped LINKAGE format	Linkage User Guide (PDF), LINKAGE format
ROADTRIPS format	ROADTRIPS
SAGE format	SAGE, openSAGE
SHAPEIT format	SHAPEIT
SIMULATE format	SIMULATE
SLINK format	FASTSLINK
SOLAR format	SOLAR
SPLINK format	SPLINK
SUP format	SUP
SimWalk2 format	SimWalk2
Structure format	Structure
VCF format	Variant Call Format (Wikipedia entry)
Vintage Mendel format	Vintage Mendel
Vitesse format	Vitesse

== Documentation ==
The Mega2 documentation is available here in HTML format, and here in PDF format.
