= Alkes Price =

American geneticist

- Born: Alkes Long Price
- Education: University of Pennsylvania
- Awards: Harvard School of Public Health Outstanding Faculty Mentor of the Year Award (2017)
- Scientific career
- Fields: Statistical genetics
- Workplaces: Harvard School of Public Health
- Thesis: Packing densities of layered patterns (1997)
- Doctoral advisor: Herbert Saul Wilf
- Doctoral students: Hilary Finucane

Alkes Long Price is an American statistical geneticist. He is Professor of Statistical Genetics in the Department of Epidemiology at the Harvard School of Public Health (HSPH), where he also holds a secondary appointment in the Department of Biostatistics. In addition, he is an associate member of the Broad Institute's Program in Medical and Population Genetics and a member of the HSPH Program in Quantitative Genomics. In 2017, he received the Outstanding Faculty Mentor of the Year Award from the Harvard School of Public Health.

== Education ==
Price received a B.S. in mathematics from the University of Chicago in 1992, and a Ph.D. in mathematics from the University of Pennsylvania in 1997.
