= Annie Qu =

American statistician

- 瞿培勇
- Education: Fudan University; University of Montana; Pennsylvania State University
- Scientific career
- Fields: Statistics
- Workplaces: University of Illinois at Urbana–Champaign
- Thesis: Adaptive Generalized Estimating Equations (1998)
- Doctoral advisor: Bruce G. Lindsay
- Website: https://publish.illinois.edu/anniequ/

Peiyong "Annie" Qu (Chinese: 瞿培勇; pinyin: Qú Péiyǒng) is a Chinese-American statistician known for her work on estimating equations and semiparametric models. Her research interests also include longitudinal analysis, nonparametric statistics and robust statistics, missing data, and biostatistics.

== Biography ==
Qu earned a bachelor's degree in computational mathematics from Fudan University in 1990. She came to the U.S. for graduate study, earned a master's degree in operations research at the University of Montana in 1992, and completed her Ph.D. in statistics at Pennsylvania State University in 1998. Her dissertation, jointly supervised by Bruce G. Lindsay and Bing Li, was Adaptive Generalized Estimating Equations.

She joined the Oregon State University faculty in 1999, and moved to the University of Illinois at Urbana–Champaign in 2008. In 2015 she added another affiliation with the Institute for Genomic Biology at Illinois. At Illinois she became Data Science Founder Professor, Brad and Karen Smith Professorial Scholar, professor of statistics, and director of the Illinois Statistics Office.

Starting July 2020, she moved to the University of California, Irvine, as a Chancellor's Professor.

== Recognition ==
In 2010, Qu was elected as a Fellow of the American Statistical Association; she became a Fellow of the Institute of Mathematical Statistics in 2016. She was the chair of the Section on Statistical Learning and Data Science of the American Statistical Association and of the Biometrics Section of the International Chinese Statistical Association for 2017. She was named to the 2021 class of Fellows of the American Association for the Advancement of Science.
