= Biomax Informatics =

German technology company

Biomax Informatics AG
- Company type: Private
- Industry: Bioinformatics, software, services
- Founded: 1997
- Headquarters: Planegg, Germany
- Key people: Klaus Heumann, CEO
- Products: See detailed listing
- Website: www.biomax.com

Biomax Informatics is a Munich-based software company specializing in research software for bioinformatics. Biomax was founded in 1997 and has its roots in the Munich Information Center for Protein Sequences (MIPS). The company's customer base consists of companies and research organizations in the areas of drug discovery, diagnostics, fine chemicals, food and plant production. In addition to exclusive software tools, Biomax Informatics provides services and curated knowledge bases.

In September 2007, Biomax Informatics acquired the Viscovery software business of the Austrian data mining specialist Eudaptics Software.

Biomax Informatics and Sophic Systems Alliance Inc. (USA) participate in the Cancer Gene Data Curation Project with the National Cancer Institute (USA). This project maintains a public data set of cancer-related genes and drugs. This data set has been integrated with the NCI's caBIO (cancer Bioinformatics Infrastructure Objects) domain model which is part of the CaBIG Integrative Cancer Research (ICR) workspace. This Cancer Gene Index can be obtained separately from an NCI web site.

== Products ==
- BioXM Knowledge Management Environment
- BioRS Integration and Retrieval System
- Pedant-Pro Sequence Analysis Suite

== Subsidiaries ==
- Viscovery Software GmbH

== See also ==
- Bioinformatics
- Bioinformatics companies
