= PulseNet =

Public health network

Since 1996, PulseNet is a network, "a collaboration with the Centers for Disease Control and Prevention; the US Department of Agriculture, Food Safety and Inspection Service; the US Food and Drug Administration; 4 state public health laboratories; and the Association of Public Health Laboratories", run by the Centers for Disease Control and Prevention which brings together public health and food regulatory agency laboratories around the United States. Through the network, cooperating groups can share next-generation sequencing (NGS) results which act as fingerprints to distinguish strains of organisms such as E. coli (O157:H7 and non O157), Salmonella, Shigella, Listeria, Campylobacter, Vibrio cholerae and Vibrio parahaemolyticus. In this way, efforts to combat infectious disease outbreaks are strengthened. Specifically, by sharing results, it is easier to identify large-scale outbreaks. For example, if an outbreak of E. coli occurred in two distant parts of the country, PulseNet might help prove a link between the two. In such a case, the pathogen would have the same genetic fingerprint at both locations.

== History ==
In the 1992–1993 Jack in the Box E. coli outbreak, 732 people became sick and 4 of them died after eating food from Jack in the Box restaurants in California, Idaho, Washington, and Nevada. It took 39 days to determine that the infections were related and more than a month to find that E. coli contaminated hamburger was making people sick. Food safety experts and scientists determined that if public health laboratories could each conduct DNA analysis on bacteria and share the data events could be correlated and outbreaks clusters could be identified more quickly.

== Other networks ==
Due to the success of Pulsenet USA since its inception in 1996, similar networks have been established internationally in Canada (2000), the Asia Pacific (2002), Europe (2003), Latin America (2003), and the Middle East (2006). These networks collaborate under the umbrella of PulseNet International. PulseNet participants use the BioNumerics software suite for database maintenance, tiff image normalization, and analysis and pattern comparisons.

The objectives of PulseNet International are to perform molecular surveillance of foodborne diseases at the global level in order to facilitate international outbreak detection and investigation by partnering with public health laboratories throughout the world and by building capacity for molecular surveillance of foodborne pathogens.

Additionally, the participants collaborate on the development, validation and implementation of internationally standardized subtyping methods to be used in the networks and perform collaborative studies on the geographic distribution and spread of different clones of foodborne pathogens.

== See also ==
- Pulsed field gel electrophoresis (PFGE)
- Infectious disease
- Outbreak
- Foodborne illness
