= Hilary Finucane =

American computational biologist

Hilary Kiyo Finucane
- Education: Massachusetts Institute of Technology; Harvard College; Weizmann Institute of Science
- Scientific career
- Workplaces: Broad Institute
- Thesis: Functional and cross-trait genetic architecture of common diseases and complex traits (2017)
- Doctoral advisor: Alkes Price

Hilary Kiyo Finucane is an American computational biologist who is Co-Director of the Program in Medical and Population Genetics at the Broad Institute. Her group combines genetic data with molecular data to understand the origins and mechanisms of disease.

== Early life and education ==
Finucane grew up in Maryland. She has said that her family enjoyed music and science. Finucane became interested in policy as a child, and started an Amnesty International student chapter at her high school. She was an undergraduate student at Harvard College, where eventually majored in mathematics and spent her spare time taking part in chamber music. After graduating from Harvard in 2009 Finucane moved to Israel where she joined the Weizmann Institute of Science. Here she focused on theoretical computer science, completing a dissertation on geometric group theory. She developed an analytical tool (the maximal information coefficient) that allows users to search complex data sets in an effort to identify meaningful relationships. Finucane became interested in the application of complex theoretical mathematics to the real world. She returned to the United States in 2012, where she worked toward a doctorate in applied mathematics at Massachusetts Institute of Technology. She eventually started working with Alkes Price, with whom she developed statistical methods for understanding the genetic basis of human disease. In particular, Finucane considered how specific parts of the genome relate to activity in different cell types, making use of genome-wide association studies (GWAS) to model these relationships.

== Research and career ==
Finucane was appointed a Schmidt Fellow at the Broad Institute. She was awarded an National Institutes of Health Independence Award to combine data from ENCODE, the Encyclopedia of DNA Elements, with GWAS and other biological information to better understand the cell types relevant to a particular disease. Soon after joining the Broad Institute, Finucane was made Associate Director of Medical and Population Genetics.

== Selected publications ==
- Bulik-Sullivan, Brendan K.; Loh, Po-Ru; Finucane, Hilary K.; Ripke, Stephan; Yang, Jian; Patterson, Nick; Daly, Mark J.; Price, Alkes L.; Neale, Benjamin M. (2015). "LD Score regression distinguishes confounding from polygenicity in genome-wide association studies". Nature Genetics. 47 (3): 291–295. doi:10.1038/ng.3211. ISSN 1546-1718. PMC 4495769. PMID 25642630.
- Finucane, Hilary K.; Bulik-Sullivan, Brendan; Gusev, Alexander; Trynka, Gosia; Reshef, Yakir; Loh, Po-Ru; Anttila, Verneri; Xu, Han; Zang, Chongzhi; Farh, Kyle; Ripke, Stephan (2015). "Partitioning heritability by functional annotation using genome-wide association summary statistics". Nature Genetics. 47 (11): 1228–1235. doi:10.1038/ng.3404. ISSN 1546-1718. PMC 4626285. PMID 26414678.
- Reshef, David N.; Reshef, Yakir A.; Finucane, Hilary K.; Grossman, Sharon R.; McVean, Gilean; Turnbaugh, Peter J.; Lander, Eric S.; Mitzenmacher, Michael; Sabeti, Pardis C. (2011-12-16). "Detecting Novel Associations in Large Data Sets". Science. 334 (6062): 1518–1524. Bibcode:2011Sci...334.1518R. doi:10.1126/science.1205438. ISSN 0036-8075. PMC 3325791. PMID 22174245.

== Personal life ==
Finucane is married to Yakir Reshef, a computer scientist who works on the immune system. She met him during middle school.
