= Digene =

Defunct molecular diagnostics company based in Gaithersburg, Maryland, US

- Founded: 1984; 41 years ago Gaithersburg, Maryland, U.S.
- Founder: Floyd Taub
- Defunct: 2007 (brought by Qiagen)
- Products: Diagnostics

Digene Corporation was a molecular diagnostics company with company headquarters in Gaithersburg, Maryland, U.S. Floyd Taub, M.D, founded the company in 1984 and it was incorporated in 1985. He established identifying specific types of human papillomavirus as the companies chief project in 1986. He guided the company through development of unique methods to do this and Digene's acquisition of the Molecular Diagnostics division of Life Technologies.

In 1988, this group had created the first diagnostic test for human papillomavirus, and gained FDA approval for this test requiring radioactive reagents.The test was named ViraPap. Life Technologies, had been formed by the merger of GIBCO and Bethesda Research Laboratories in 1983. Clinical uptake of ViraPap was slow, and Life sold the test and associated intellectual property to Digene in 1990, soon after Digene was acquired by the Whitehead group. Digene's history in non-radioactive detection methods allowed it to modify the test to not require radioactive materials. This modified hybrid capture HPV test became Digene's most important product line.

In 2007, Qiagen bought the company for US$1.6 billion.
