= AstridBio =

AstridBio Ltd.
- Company type: Privately held company
- Industry: Bioinformatics Software, Biotechnology
- Headquarters: Szeged, Hungary
- Area served: Worldwide
- Website: https://astridbio.eu/

AstridBio Ltd. is a privately held biotechnology company based in Szeged, Hungary. Started in 2003, AstridBio's focus is in biobanking software development, data management and analysis for genomics research. Its clients include academic research institutes, pharmaceutical and biotech companies.

== Products ==
- SmartBiobank is a free, online biobank software designed to help clinicians, lab biologists and researchers integrate research elements into one single system. SmartBiobank can store, manage, and analyze biospecimen data, clinical data, and experimental data. It is meant to support the establishment of clinical biobanks and the creation of patient registries.
- Disease Discovery Suites are each based on the type of disease that is the focus of the investigation; this includes chronic, rare, malignant and infectious diseases. The purpose of the suites is the biological interpretation of structured NGS data - assisting the researcher in revealing the genetic background of diseases or providing an answer to related research questions.
- GenoMiner is an IT platform for next generation sequencing data analysis. It is specifically marketed to biologists.

== Services ==
AstridBio has services meant for users in these fields:

- Bioinformatics, biostatistics, data analysis and data mining for high-throughput -omics data, including genomics, transcriptomics, epigenomics, metagenomics, proteomics, metabolomics
- biobank systems for large-scale data gathering, data integration, visualization, and data interpretation

== Projects ==
AstridBio has already been involved in many European research projects:

- My Health Avatar is a proof of concept for the digital representation of patient health status. It is designed as a lifetime companion for individual citizens that will facilitate the collection of long-term health-status information.
- MAMM (Metagenome Analysis of Moss-Associated Microbiomes) is a project which aims to explore and analyze the ecology of the area-specific community composition (the Alpine bog) with the help of metagenomic approaches using NGS technology.
- BIOREQ (Model Requirements for the Management of Biological Repositories) is a comprehensive guideline that covers the full range of research and operation activities applicable to biological repositories or biobanks.
- DRSCREEN (Developing a computer-based image processing system for diabetic retinopathy screening) is an automated image analysing system for retinopathy screening.
- SCHIZO aims to develop biomarkers and methods to support the discovery and development of novel drugs for the treatment of psychotic disorders.
- Joint Research on Melanoma Therapy aims to develop a bioinformatics tool to predict and optimize the expression profile and the behavioral pattern of the target melanoma cells effecting RNA-based vectors and to determine optimized RNA-based vectors for melanoma vaccination.

== See also ==
- List of bioinformatics companies
