= Qiagen =

German biotechnology company

QIAGEN N.V.
- Type: Public (Naamloze vennootschap)
- Traded as: NYSE: QGEN; FWB: QIA; Russell 1000 component; DAX component
- ISIN: NL0015001WM6
- Industry: Biotechnology
- Founded: November 29, 1984; 41 years ago
- Founders: Metin Colpan; Karsten Henco; Jürgen Schumacher
- Headquarters: Venlo, Netherlands (corporate); Hilden, Germany (operational)
- Key people: Thierry Bernard (CEO); Lawrence A. Rosen (chairman of supervisory board)
- Revenue: ▼US$1.97 billion (2023)
- Operating income: ▼US$410 million (2023)
- Net income: ▼US$341 million (2023)
- Total assets: ▼US$6.12 billion (2023)
- Total equity: ▲US$3.81 billion (2023)
- Number of employees: 5,967 (2023)
- Website: qiagen.com

QIAGEN N.V. is a German-founded multinational provider of sample and assay technologies for molecular diagnostics, applied testing, academic research, and pharmaceutical research. The company operates in more than 35 offices in over 25 countries. QIAGEN N.V., the global corporate headquarter of the QIAGEN group, is located in Venlo, The Netherlands. The main operative headquarters are located in Hilden, Germany. European, American, Chinese, and Asian-Pacific regional headquarters are located respectively in Hilden, Germany; Germantown, Maryland, United States; Shanghai, China; and Singapore. QIAGEN's shares are listed at the NYSE (using ticker QGEN) and at the Frankfurt Stock Exchange in the Prime Standard (using ticker QIA). Thierry Bernard is the company's Chief Executive Officer (CEO).

== History ==
In 1984, QIAGEN was established on November 29 by a team of scientists at the Heinrich Heine University Düsseldorf, Germany. Two years later, QIAGEN launched its first product. A kit for the purification of plasmids—small ring-shaped DNA molecules in bacterial cells. 1996 saw the initial public offering of QIAGEN on the American technology-oriented Nasdaq stock exchange, becoming the first German company to do so. 1997 saw the initial public offering on the Frankfurt Stock Exchange in Germany.

=== Acquisitions and Business Development Timeline ===
In 2004, QIAGEN acquired key assets of Molecular Staging, Inc. Two years later, QIAGEN established its Asia regional headquarters in Shanghai. In 2007 sales were US$649.8 million with more than 2,600 employees. QIAGEN acquired Digene for US$1.6 billion, furthering QIAGEN in molecular diagnostics by revenue and diagnostics for disease prevention.

In 2009, QIAGEN began building its Personalized Healthcare business through the acquisition of DxS Ltd, in a deal valued at US$95 million and it acquired SABiosciences Corp. in a deal valued at US$90 million. During this year it released a clinically verified diagnostic test for the detection of H1N1, more commonly known as Swine Flu. During 2009 QIAGEN had over US$1 billion in revenue and over 3,500 employees.

In 2010, QIAGEN acquired ESE GmbH for point of need testing devices for the application of molecular diagnostic tests without laboratory infrastructure.

In 2011, QIAGEN acquired Ipsogen S.A. for US$101 million, adding to the company's product and IP portfolio in the blood cancer space. QIAGEN also acquired Cellestis Limited for US$374 million, giving the company access to QuantiFERON technology for disease detection and prevention. The company added two new offices in the Asia Pacific region in New Delhi, India and Taipei, Taiwan. The company announced a comprehensive restructuring program to focus on high-growth areas such as personalized medicine and business in emerging markets. The program includes workforce reduction and internal restructuring affecting approximately 10% of the company's 3,900 positions.

In 2013, QIAGEN acquired Ingenuity Systems. QIAGEN also acquired CLC bio, which offers bioinformatics analysis software.

In 2015, QIAGEN acquired AdnaGen's circulating tumor cell enrichment technology. QIAGEN also acquired Enzymatic enzyme solutions. In March 2015, Qiagen divested its Marseille unit through a management buyout that led to the creation of HalioDx. In late 2015 the GeneReader NGS System was launched, and the acquisition of Mo Bio Laboratories was completed.

In 2016, QIAGEN acquired the Danish molecular diagnostics company Exiqon.

In 2017, QIAGEN acquired OmicSoft Corporation, a leading provider of highly curated public datasets.

In 2018, QIAGEN transferred its U.S. listing to the New York Stock Exchange. In April 2018, QIAGEN acquired the Spanish firm STAT-Dx and launched the QIAstat-Dx molecular diagnostics platform.

In 2019, QIAGEN announced the acquisition of Formulatrix assets to develop a digital PCR platform. An additional acquisition of N-of-One, a privately held U.S. molecular decision support company and pioneer in clinical interpretation services for complex genomic data, allowed it to expand its Qiagen Clinical Insights (QCI) bioinformatics offerings. In October 2019 QIAGEN entered into an agreement with Illumina granting QIAGEN non-exclusive rights to develop and globally commercialize *in vitro* diagnostic kits to be used together with Illumina's diagnostic instruments.

In September 2020 QIAGEN announced the acquisition of Michigan-based NeuMoDx Inc. giving it two fully integrated systems for automated PCR.

In May 2022, QIAGEN acquired the majority stake in BLIRT S.A., adding new R&D and manufacturing capabilities for customized and standardized recombinant enzymes, as well as molecular biology reagents.

In January 2023, the business announced its intention to acquire Verogen for $150 million. This deal included acquiring GEDmatch, a genetic genealogy service.

Qiagen Acquisitions
- Qiagen
  - Molecular Staging, Inc. (Acq 2004)
  - Digene (Acq 2007)
  - Corbett Life Science (Acq 2008)
  - DxS Ltd (Acq 2009)
  - SABiosciences Corp. (Acq 2009)
  - ESE GmbH (Acq 2010)
  - Ipsogen S.A. (Acq 2011)
  - Cellestis Limited (Acq 2011)
  - Ingenuity Systems (Acq 2013)
  - CLC bio (Acq 2013)
  - Exiqon (Acq 2016)
  - STAT-Dx (Acq 2018)
  - Formulatrix (Acq 2019)
  - OmicSoft (Acq 2017)
  - N-of-One (Acq 2019)
  - Molecular Staging, Inc. (Acq 2020)
  - NeuMoDx Molecular Inc (Acq 2020)
  - Verogen (Acq 2023)

=== 2020 Thermo Fisher Acquisition Target ===
On March 3, 2020, Thermo Fisher Scientific announced plans for the acquisition of QIAGEN at €39 per share in cash, which valued the transaction at $11.5 billion at the time. The day after an open letter by hedge fund Davidson Kempner Capital Management, one of QIAGEN's largest shareholders, to reject the bid as undervalued, Thermo Fisher raised their tender by 10% to €43 per share, an advance of $1B in value.

The acquisition offer was terminated on August 13, 2020, having only reached the threshold of 47% shareholder approval, below the minimum 66.6% required as per the agreement. Because of the lapsed offer, QIAGEN was required to reimburse $95 million to Thermo Fisher in expenses.

Resulting from the failed takeover bid, QIAGEN announced it would buy the outstanding 80.1% of shares in NeuMoDx Molecular Inc., which it did not already own, for about $234 million.
