= DNADynamo =

- Developer(s): BlueTractorSoftware Ltd
- Operating system: Mac OS X, Windows, Linux
- Platform: Java
- Type: Bioinformatics
- License: commercial
- Website: bluetractorsoftware.co.uk

DNADynamo is a commercial DNA sequence analysis software package produced by Blue Tractor Software Ltd that runs on Microsoft Windows, Mac OS X and Linux It is used by molecular biologists to analyze DNA and Protein sequences. A free demo is available from the software developers website.

== Features ==
DNADynamo is a general purpose DNA and Protein sequence analysis package that can carry out most of the functions required by a standard research molecular biology laboratory

- DNA and Protein Sequence viewing, editing and annotating
- Contig assembly and chromatogram editing including comparison to a reference sequence to identify mutations
- Global Sequence alignment with ClustalW and MUSCLE and editing.
- Select and drag Sequence alignment editing for hand made dna vs protein alignments
- Restriction site analysis - for viewing restriction cut sites in tables and on linear and circular maps.
- A Subcloning tool for the assembly of constructs using Restriction Sites or Gibson assembly,
- Agarose Gel simulation.
- Online Database searching - Search public databases at the NCBI such as Genbank and UniProt.
- Online BLAST searches.
- Protein analysis including estimation of Molecular Weight, Extinction Coefficient and pI.
- PCR Primer design, including an interface to Primer3
- 3D structure viewing via an interface to Jmol

== History ==
DNADynamo has been developed since 2004 by BlueTractorSoftware Ltd, a software development company based in North Wales, UK
