= BioNumerics =

Bioinformatics software suite

- Developer: Applied Maths N.V.
- Stable release: 8.0
- Operating system: Windows
- Platform: C++, Python
- Type: Bioinformatics
- License: commercial
- Website: http://www.applied-maths.com

BioNumerics is a bioinformatics desktop software application that manages microbiological data. It is developed by Applied Maths NV, a bioMérieux company.

== History ==
BioNumerics was first released in 1998. PulseNet, a network run by the Centers for Disease Control and Prevention (CDC), uses BioNumerics to compare pulsed field gel electrophoresis (PFGE) patterns and whole genome sequences from different bacterial strains. CaliciNet, an outbreak surveillance network for noroviruses, is another example of a network which uses BioNumerics to submit norovirus sequences and basic epidemiologic information to a central database.

== Features ==
The basis of BioNumerics is a database consisting of entries. The entries correspond to the individual organisms or samples under study and are characterized by a unique key and by a number of user-defined information fields. Each entry in a database may be characterized by one or more experiments that can be linked easily to the entry. In BioNumerics, experiments are divided in seven classes: fingerprints, spectra, characters, sequences, sequence read sets, trend data and matrices.

Examples of BioNumerics applications are whole genome Multi Locus Sequence Typing (wgMLST), whole genome Single Nucleotide Polymorphisms (wgSNP), genome comparison, identification based on MALDI-TOF Mass Spectrometry, PFGE typing, Amplified Fragment Length Polymorphism (AFLP) typing, sequence-based typing of viruses, antibiotic resistance profiling and functional genotyping.
