= Bruce G. Lindsay =

American statistician

- Born: March 7, 1947; The Dalles, Oregon
- Died: May 5, 2015 (aged 68)
- Education: University of Oregon
- Alma mater: University of Washington
- Known for: Contributions to mixture modeling and likelihood theory
- Scientific career
- Fields: Statistics
- Institutions: Pennsylvania State University
- Doctoral advisor: Norman Breslow
- Doctoral students: Annie Qu; Kathryn Roeder

Bruce George Lindsay (March 7, 1947 – May 5, 2015) was an American statistician best known for his contributions to mixture modeling and likelihood theory.

== Biography ==
Lindsay was born in 1947 in The Dalles, Oregon. He earned a B.A. in mathematics from the University of Oregon in 1969 and a Ph.D. in biomathematics from the University of Washington in 1978. Between his undergraduate and graduate studies he has served in the U.S. Coast Guard for four years during the Vietnam War. He joined the Pennsylvania State University faculty in 1979, heading the Department of Statistics in 1998–2000 and 2006–2012 and rising to the rank of Eberly Chair in Statistics in 2012. He was also a visiting professor at the Johns Hopkins University in 1987, the Yale University in 1990, and North Carolina State University in 2004–2005. He was elected to be a Fellow of the Institute of Mathematical Statistics in 1987, of the Guggenheim Foundation in 1996, and of the American Statistical Association in 1998.

== Selected publications ==
- Lindsay, Bruce G. "Mixture models: theory, geometry and applications." NSF-CBMS regional conference series in probability and statistics. Institute of Mathematical Statistics and the American Statistical Association, 1995.
- Lindsay, Bruce G. "The geometry of mixture likelihoods: a general theory." The Annals of Statistics 11.1 (1983): 86–94.
- Lindsay, Bruce G. "Composite likelihood methods." Contemporary Mathematics 80.1 (1988): 221–39.
- Lindsay, Bruce G. "Efficiency versus robustness: the case for minimum Hellinger distance and related methods." The Annals of Statistics 22.2 (1994): 1081–1114.
- Lindsay, Bruce G. "The geometry of mixture likelihoods, part II: the exponential family." The Annals of Statistics 11.3 (1983): 783–792.
