= Blast2GO =

Bioinformatics software tool

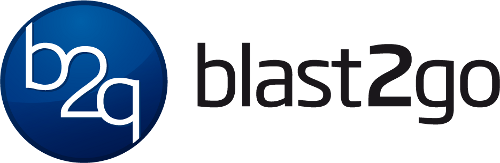
- Blast2GO
- Type: Bioinformatics Software
- Inception: 2011
- Manufacturer: BioBam Bioinformatics
- Models: Demo, Basic, Trial, Pro, Plugin, Commandline
- Website: https://www.blast2go.com

Blast2GO, first published in 2005, is a bioinformatics software tool for the automatic, high-throughput functional annotation of novel sequence data (genes proteins). It makes use of the BLAST algorithm to identify similar sequences to then transfers existing functional annotation from characterized sequences to the novel one. The functional information is represented via the Gene Ontology (GO), a controlled vocabulary of functional attributes. The Gene Ontology, or GO, is a major bioinformatics initiative to unify the representation of gene and gene product attributes across all species.

== See also ==
- Protein function prediction
- Functional genomics
- Bioinformatics
