= European Genome-phenome Archive =

Online archive of genetic and phenotypic human data

- Producer: European Molecular Biology Laboratory-European Bioinformatics Institute, Centre for Genomic Regulation (United Kingdom and Spain)
- Languages: English

Access
- Cost: Free

Coverage
- Disciplines: Biomedical sciences
- Format coverage: Datasets

Links
- Website: EGA Official Portal

European Genome-phenome Archive (EGA) is a repository for human biomolecular and phenotypic data in the United Kingdom and Spain. It involves the secure storage of all potentially identifiable genetic data, phenotypic and clinical data generated by biomedical research programs.

As of March 2022, it stores and harvest data regarding over 4,500 research studies from over 1,000 institutions worldwide.

== History ==
EGA was launched in 2008 by the European Molecular Biology Laboratory’s European Bioinformatics Institute (EMBL-EBI) to support the voluntary archiving and dissemination of human genomic data requiring secure storage and distribution only to authorized researchers in a manner that "respects the consent agreements signed by the study subjects." Later, the EGA has expanded its scope of collaboration with the Centre for Genomic Regulation (CRG) in Barcelona.

=== Controlled access ===
It offers the essential security required to regulate access, safeguard patient confidentiality, and provide access to those researchers and clinicians authorized to view controlled access data. Nevertheless, decisions about data access are not made by the EGA but rather by the appropriate data access-granting organization (DAO).
