= GeneTalk =

GeneTalk is a web-based platform, tool, and database for filtering, reduction and prioritization of human sequence variants from next-generation sequencing (NGS) data. GeneTalk allows editing annotation about sequence variants and build up a crowd sourced database with clinically relevant information for diagnostics of genetic disorders. GeneTalk allows searching for information about specific sequence variants and connects to experts on variants that are potentially disease-relevant.

== Application to diagnostics ==
Users can upload NGS data in Variant Call Format (VCF) onto the GeneTalk server into their accounts. All entries of the file are preprocessed and shown in the integrated VCF viewer. Filtering tools are set by the user to reduce the number of clinically non-relevant variants. After filtering and prioritization users can interpret relevant variants by retrieving information (annotations) about variants from the GeneTalk database. The communication platform allow users to contact experts about specific variants, genes, or genetic disorders, to exchange knowledge and expertise.

=== Analysis procedure ===
Steps required to analyze VCF files

1. Upload VCF file
2. Edit pedigree and phenotype information for segregation filtering
3. Filter VCF file by editing the filtering options
4. View results and annotations
5. Add annotations

=== Filtering tools ===
The following filtering options may be used to reduce the non-relevant sequence variants in VCF files.

- Functional – filter out variants that have effects on protein level
- Linkage – filter out variants that are on specified chromosomes
- Gene panel – filter variants by genes or gene panels, subscribe to publicly available gene panels or create own ones
- Frequency – show only variants with a genotype frequency lower than specified
- Inheritance – filter out variants by presumed mode of inheritance
- Annotation – show only variants with a score for medical relevance and scientific evidence

== Communication platform and expert network ==
Users can share VCF files with colleagues and coworkers. The integrated mailing systems allows users to contact experts easily. Users can create annotations and comments and rate annotations regarding medical relevance and scientific evidence, that is helpful for the community of users for diagnosis of genetic disorders. Registered users provide information about their field of knowledge in their profile and can be contacted by other users.

== Potential applications ==
- Developing diagnostics
- Genetic analysis
- Capturing data generated by community
- Communication and exchange of knowledge and expertise
