= Munich Information Center for Protein Sequences =

German research center

Coordinates: 48.2211°N 11.5878°E

MIPS

Content
- Description: curated databases and comprehensive secondary data resources

Contact
- Laboratory: Institute for Bioinformatics and Systems Biology
- Authors: H Werner Mewes
- Primary citation: Mewes & al. (2011)
- Release date: 2010

Access
- Website: http://mips.helmholtz-muenchen.de

The Munich Information Center for Protein Sequences (MIPS) was a research center hosted at the Institute for Bioinformatics (IBI) at Neuherberg, Germany with a focus on genome oriented bioinformatics, in particular on the systematic analysis of genome information including the development and application of bioinformatics methods in genome annotation, gene expression analysis and proteomics. MIPS supported and maintained a set of generic databases as well as the systematic comparative analysis of microbial, fungal, and plant genomes.

As of September 2019, the institute was closed after 18 years of service, and several of its subdivisions were reorganized to resources, both internal and external.
