= Kathryn Roeder =

American statistician

Kathryn M. Roeder
- Education: University of Idaho; Pennsylvania State University
- Scientific career
- Fields: Statistics
- Institutions: Yale University; Carnegie Mellon University
- Thesis: Method of Spacings for Semiparametric Inference (1998)
- Doctoral advisor: Bruce G. Lindsay
- Doctoral students: Jung-Ying Tzeng

Kathryn M. Roeder is an American statistician known for her development of statistical methods to uncover the genetic basis of complex disease and her contributions to mixture models, semiparametric inference, and multiple testing. Roeder holds positions as professor of statistics and professor of computational biology at Carnegie Mellon University, where she leads a project focused on discovering genes associated with autism.

== Education and career ==
Roeder did her undergraduate studies at the University of Idaho, where she graduated in 1982 with a bachelor's degree in wildlife resources. Roeder worked as a biologist for a year in the Pacific Northwest before returning to academia for graduate studies in statistics. She completed her Ph.D. in 1988 at Pennsylvania State University; her dissertation, supervised by Bruce G. Lindsay, was Method of Spacings for Semiparametric Inference.

Roeder joined the faculty of Yale University in 1988 and earned tenure there. She remained at Yale until 1994, when she moved to the statistics department at Carnegie Mellon. She added a second appointment in computational biology in 1998, and served a term as Vice Provost for Faculty from 2015 to 2019.

== Recognition ==
In 1995 Roeder became an elected member of the International Statistical Institute. She was elected a Fellow of the American Statistical Association in 1996. In 1997 she received two major awards from the Committee of Presidents of Statistical Societies: the Presidents' Award "in recognition of outstanding contributions to the profession of statistics", and the George W. Snedecor Award, for her work in biometry with Bruce Lindsay and Raymond J. Carroll. In the same year she was elected as a fellow of the Institute of Mathematical Statistics, and in 1999 gave the Medallion Lecture of the Institute of Mathematical Statistics. She won the Janet L Norwood Award for outstanding achievement by a woman in the statistical sciences in 2013. Roeder was elected to the National Academy of Sciences and as a fellow of the American Association for the Advancement of Science (AAAS) in 2019. She was awarded the 2020 R. A. Fisher Lectureship.

== Personal ==
Roeder is married to Bernard J. Devlin, a psychiatrist at the University of Pittsburgh, and has worked with him on research involving genetics and autism.

== Selected publications ==
- Roeder, Kathryn; Carroll, Raymond J.; Lindsay, Bruce G. (1996), "A semiparametric mixture approach to case-control studies with errors in covariables", Journal of the American Statistical Association, 91 (434): 722–732, doi:10.2307/2291667, JSTOR 2291667, MR 1395739
- Devlin, B.; Daniels, Michael; Roeder, Kathryn (July 1997), "The heritability of IQ", Nature, 388 (6641): 468–471, Bibcode:1997Natur.388..468D, doi:10.1038/41319, PMID 9242404, S2CID 4313884
- Roeder, Kathryn; Wasserman, Larry (September 1997), "Practical Bayesian density estimation using mixtures of normals", Journal of the American Statistical Association, 92 (439): 894–902, Bibcode:1997JASA...92..894R, doi:10.1080/01621459.1997.10474044.
- Devlin, B.; Roeder, Kathryn (December 1999), "Genomic control for association studies", Biometrics, 55 (4): 997–1004, doi:10.1111/j.0006-341x.1999.00997.x, JSTOR 2533712, PMID 11315092, S2CID 6297807
- Jones, Bobby L.; Nagin, Daniel S.; Roeder, Kathryn (February 2001), "A SAS procedure based on mixture models for estimating developmental trajectories", Sociological Methods & Research, 29 (3): 374–393, doi:10.1177/0049124101029003005, S2CID 15594963
- Wasserman, Larry; Roeder, Kathryn (2009), "High-dimensional variable selection", The Annals of Statistics, 37 (5A): 2178–2201, arXiv:0704.1139, doi:10.1214/08-AOS646, MR 2543689, PMC 2752029, PMID 19784398
