= Malka Gorfine =

Israeli statistician

Malka Gorfine Orgad (Hebrew: מלכה גורפיין אורגד, born 1967) is an Israeli statistician and a professor in the Department of Statistics of Tel Aviv University. Her research interests include deep learning in survival analysis, causal inference, and natural experiments in biostatistics.

== Education and career ==
Gorfine studied statistics at the Hebrew University of Jerusalem, receiving a master's degree in 1994 and completing her Ph.D. in 1999.

After two years as a staff scientist at the Fred Hutchinson Cancer Research Center in Seattle in the United States, she returned to Israel in 2001 as a lecturer in the Mathematics and Statistics Department of Bar-Ilan University, where she continued to work as a senior lecturer from 2004 to 2007. Meanwhile, she took a second senior lectureship in the Faculty of Industrial Engineering and Management at the Technion – Israel Institute of Technology, in 2005, and in 2010 she became an associate professor at the Technion. In 2014 she moved to the Department of Statistics and Operations Research at Tel Aviv University, and in 2016 she was promoted to full professor. She also continues to hold an affiliate investigator position with the Fred Hutchinson Cancer Research Center.

== Recognition ==
Gorfine was elected as a Fellow of the American Statistical Association in 2025.
