= Biomatters =

Bioinformatics software company

Biomatters is an applied bioinformatics company that creates integrated bioinformatics software. Biomatters was founded in 2003 and headquartered in New Zealand with an office in the United States, and users in 125 countries worldwide.

== Software ==
Biomatters flagship software is Geneious Prime, a suite of molecular biology and NGS analysis tools. In December 2017 Biomatters released a new enterprise software, Geneious Biologics, which is targeted at companies engaged in commercial antibody screening.

== Awards ==
Biomatters has won a number of awards including:

- 2007: Computerworld Excellence Awards from Innovative Use of ICT
- 2009: Recruit IT Innovative Software Product Award at the PriceWaterhouseCoopers Hi-Tech Awards
- 2012: Microsoft Hi-Tech Emerging Company Award
- 2015: Best of Show Finalist at the Bio-IT World Awards in Boston
