= Pulsed-field gel electrophoresis =

Lab technique for separation of DNA

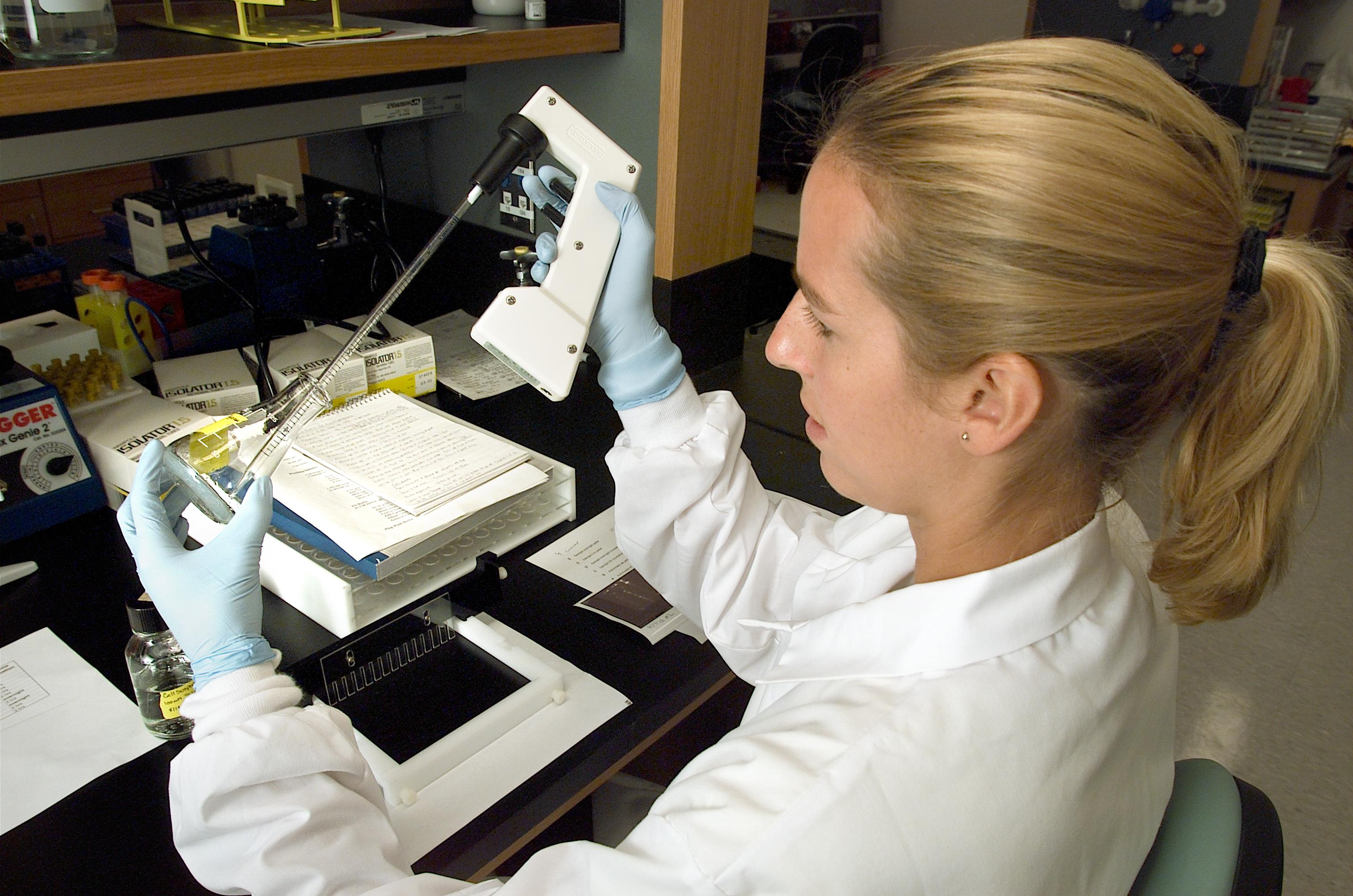
A microbiologist runs a pulsed-field gel electrophoresis test used in bacterial typing

Pulsed-field gel electrophoresis (PFGE) is a technique used for the separation of large DNA molecules by applying an electric field that periodically changes direction to a gel matrix. The mechanism driving these separations exploits the fact that very large DNA molecules unravel and "snake" through a gel matrix, and such electrophoretic trajectories are perturbed in a size-dependent manner by carefully oriented electrical pulses. Unlike standard agarose gel electrophoresis, which can separate DNA fragments of up to 50 kb, PFGE resolves fragments up to 10 Mb. This allows for the direct analysis of genomic DNA.

== History ==
In 1984, David C. Schwartz and Charles Cantor published the first successful application of alternating electric fields for the separation of large DNA molecules. This technique, which they named PFGE, resulted in the development of several variations, including Orthogonal Field Alternation Gel Electrophoresis (OFAGE), Transverse Alternating Field Electrophoresis (TAFE), Field-Inversion Gel Electrophoresis (FIGE), and Clamped Homogeneous Electric Fields (CHEF), among others.

== Procedure ==
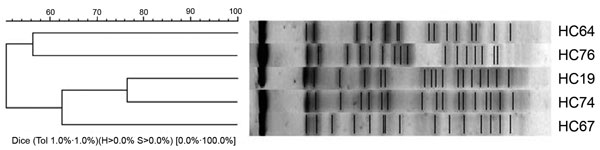
Cluster analysis in BioNumerics of the enteroaggregative Escherichia coli strains from the pulsed-field gel electrophoresis fingerprinting

The procedure for PFGE is similar to that of standard agarose gel electrophoresis, with the main exception being the application of the electric current. Generally, in PFGE electrophoresis chambers, the voltage periodically switches between three directions: one along the central axis, and two at a 60 degree angle along each side. The application of the voltage can change depending on the variation of PFGE used.

== Applications ==
PFGE may be used for genotyping or genetic fingerprinting. It has commonly been considered a gold standard in epidemiological studies of pathogenic organisms for several decades. For instance, subtyping bacterial isolates with this method has made it easier to discriminate among strains of Lactococcus garvieae and some clinical isolates of Bacillus cereus group from aquatic organisms. It can also be used to link environmental or food isolates, such as Listeria monocytogenes, with clinical infections. It is now in the process of being superseded by next generation sequencing methods.

== See also ==
- Gel electrophoresis
- Nonlinear frictiophoresis
