= CLC bio =

Danish bioinformatics software company

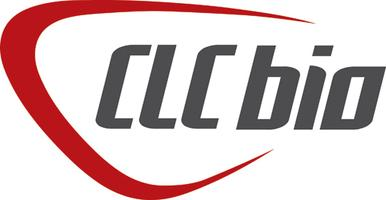
- Company type: Privately held company
- Industry: Bioinformatics
- Founded: 2005
- Headquarters: Aarhus, Denmark
- Area served: Denmark; Cambridge, Massachusetts; Tokyo; Taipei; Delhi
- Products: Software and consulting
- Website: http://www.clcbio.com (dead)

CLC bio was a bioinformatics software company that developed a software suite subsequently purchased by QIAGEN.

== History ==
CLC bio started commercial activities on January 1, 2005, headquartered in Aarhus, Denmark. Its product's development was also partly funded by collaborating with researchers on grant-funded projects. By 2012, it had additional offices in Cambridge, Massachusetts, Tokyo, Taipei and Delhi, with staff largely from research backgrounds (30% having a PhD) and had built a userbase of around 250,000 users in both academic institutions and biotechnology companies.

CLC bio was acquired by QIAGEN in 2013 and merged into its bioinformatics research and development division with several other purchased platforms in 2014.

== Software ==
CLC bio's main activities were in software development for desktop (Mac OS X, Windows, and Linux), enterprise, and cloud software for analysis of biological data. CLC bio developed some of their own open source algorithms, as well as their own SIMD-accelerated implementations of several existing popular applications. In 2010, CLC bio was notable as the first commercial platform for bioinformatics analysis that utilized a graphical user interface for building, managing, and deploying analysis workflows as well as command-line tools, a SOAP and REST API, and later, the ability to run containerized tools.

As additional capabilities were added to the software platform, it was eventually split into several themed Workbenches and plugins with collections of features relevant to different applications (e.g. pathway analysis, genomics, and other omics). Features include read mapping and de novo assembly of high-throughput sequencing data, whole-genome detection of SNPs and structural variations, ChIP-seq, RNA-Seq, small RNA analysis, genome finishing, microbial genomics, structural biology, and functions to analyze, visualize, and compare genomic, transcriptomic, and epigenomic data.

== Cloud Computing ==
In 2017, CLC bio launched their CLC Genomics Cloud Engine as a command-line driven platform for cloud-based bioinformatics workflow execution on Amazon Web Services. In 2019, this platform was adapted for and approved for use in AWS GovCloud. In 2020, CLC bio released a free plug-in that enables workflow execution on AWS directly from the CLC Genomics Workbench desktop software.

== Hardware ==
Early on, the company initially presented own-developed high-performance computing solutions, focusing on accelerating open source algorithms such as HMMER, Smith-Waterman and ClustalW, using FPGA technology. However these products are no longer under development.
