= QIAGEN Silicon Valley =

Biotechnology software company

QIAGEN Digital Insights
- Industry: Software
- Founded: 2003
- Headquarters: Redwood City, California
- Website: digitalinsights.qiagen.com

QIAGEN Digital Insights (formerly Ingenuity Systems) is a company based in Redwood City, California, USA, that develops software to analyze complex biological systems. QIAGEN Digital Insights' first product, Ingenuity Pathway Analysis (IPA), was introduced in 2003, and is used to help researchers analyze omics data and model biological systems. The software has been cited in scientific molecular biology publications and is a tool for systems biology researchers and bioinformaticians in drug discovery and institutional research.

== History ==
QIAGEN acquired Ingenuity Systems for $105 million in cash in a transaction effective April 29, 2013, intending to combine the company's genomic database and analysis software with its PCR- and next-generation sequencing-based molecular testing products. Ingenuity had net sales of approximately $20 million in 2012. Following the acquisition, the company continued to operate from its offices in Redwood City and retained its 120 employees, while chief executive Jake Leschly took on a role within QIAGEN's life science business unit.

At the time of the acquisition, Ingenuity had spent more than a decade developing its Knowledge Base, a database of computationally structured information on genetic variants associated with disease, and its customers included major pharmaceutical companies as well as hundreds of biotechnology and academic groups. The purchase took place amid increasing competition in the market for software used to interpret DNA sequence data, with contemporaneous coverage naming Knome, Silicon Valley Biosystems, Cypher Genomics and Personalis among the company's rivals.

== Products ==
At the time of its acquisition by QIAGEN, the company's portfolio consisted of a knowledge base of curated genomic variants; Ingenuity Pathway Analysis, a web-based application for modeling and analyzing biological pathways; Ingenuity Variant Analysis, used to select clinically relevant genomic variants from next-generation sequencing data; and Ingenuity iReport, software for reporting the results of gene expression experiments from RNA-seq, microarray and qPCR platforms. QIAGEN stated that it planned to incorporate content from the knowledge base into the curated database sold alongside its GeneGlobe assay portal.

The company also maintained analysis and interpretation partnerships with other firms in the sequencing market, including GeneInsight, LabCorp, Complete Genomics, Life Technologies and Illumina.

== See also ==
- Systems biology
- Bioinformatics
- Computational genomics
- Computational biology
- Microarray analysis
- DNA microarray
- Pathway analysis
