= Statistical genetics =

Statistical genetics is a scientific field concerned with the development and application of statistical methods for drawing inferences from genetic data. The term is most commonly used in the context of human genetics. Research in statistical genetics generally involves developing theory or methodology to support research in one of three related areas:

- population genetics – Study of evolutionary processes affecting genetic variation between organisms
- genetic epidemiology – Studying effects of genes on diseases
- quantitative genetics – Studying the effects of genes on 'normal' phenotypes

Statistical geneticists tend to collaborate closely with geneticists, molecular biologists, clinicians and bioinformaticians. Statistical genetics is a type of computational biology.

== History ==
In the early 20th century, R. A. Fisher's 1918 work helped reconcile Mendelian and biometric approaches to continuous traits and introduced the infinitesimal model, which became foundational in quantitative genetics.
