= Centre for Genomic Regulation =

Spanish biomedical research institute

Coordinates: 41.3855°N 2.1940°E

CRG, Centre for Genomic Regulation
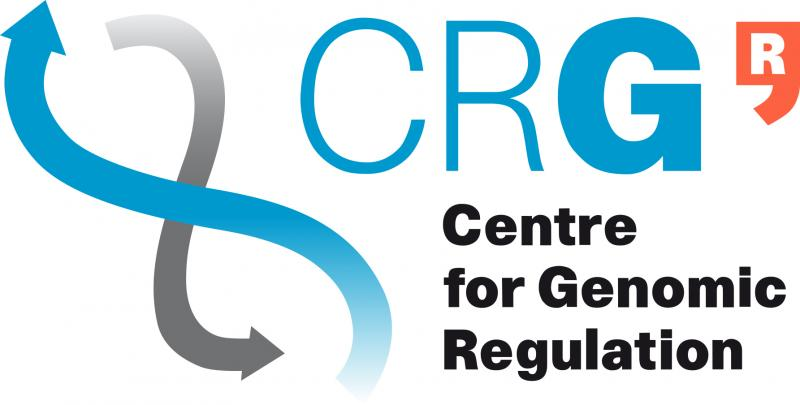
- Established: 2000
- Director: Luis Serrano
- Staff: ~400
- Location: Barcelona, Spain
- Website: https://www.crg.eu

The Centre for Genomic Regulation (CRG, Centre de Regulació Genòmica in Catalan) is a biomedical and genomics research centre based in Barcelona. Most of its facilities and laboratories are located in the Barcelona Biomedical Research Park, in front of Somorrostro beach.

Since July 2015 CNAG (the National Centre for Genomic Analysis), located in the Parc Científic de Barcelona (close to Camp Nou), became an outstation of CRG. CRG is member of EU-LIFE, an alliance of leading life sciences research centres in Europe.

== Research programs ==
=== Bioinformatics and Genomics ===
There are several lines of research within Bioinformatics and Genomics. Gene Prediction and Modeling of Splicing is related to the research on Regulation of Alternative Splicing, Regulation of Protein Synthesis within the Gene Regulation program, and Genes and Diseases program. Another research line involves identification and characterization of genomic regions associated with gene regulation. This is connected to research on Chromatin and Gene Expression, as well as research on RNA proteins interactions. Yet another line of research pertains to Molecular Evolution, which includes evolution of the exonic structure of genes and splicing.

The "Bioinformatics" program is associated with the Research Group in Biomedical Informatics (GRIB). In this group, research lines in Molecular Modeling, Protein Structure Prediction, and Complex Systems are in their nascent stages.

=== Cell and Developmental Biology ===
Cell and Developmental Biology, or CDB, is built on the idea that the cell should be the primary focus of developmental biology, and that a cell ought to be understood in the context of its 'host' organism.

Because the principles that underlie the behavior of proteins within and across cells are poorly understood, the CDB program aims to study the interactions between intercellular signaling systems and the cytoskeleton. Another goal is to understand how this affects cellular spatial organization and information processing. Methods include multidimensional phenotypes grounded in genomics and proteomics.

=== Gene Regulation, Stem Cells, and Cancer ===
The Gene Regulation, Stem Cells, and Cancer program focus on mechanisms of gene expression, mechanisms of epigenetic regulation, and the molecular underpinnings of cellular operations pertaining to tissue homeostasis and cancer. Gene regulation studies include the organization and evolution of the regulatory genome, chromatin composition and transcriptional regulation mediated by steroid hormones, epigenetic mechanisms in leukemia and stem cells, regulation of periodic splicing and mRNA translation, and gene function and epigenetic reprogramming in embryogenesis and the germline. Stem cell research includes differentiation and transdifferentiation in the hematopoietic system, somatic cell reprogramming, and tissue regeneration.

=== Systems Biology ===
Systems Biology research includes dynamic gene regulatory networks and systems neuroscience. Some models used are prokaryotes, cell lines, C. elegans, Drosophila, and mice.

This research program combines systematic and quantitative data collection with computational models, with the goal of discovering dynamic comprehension of complex biological processes. An interdisciplinary approach is applied, as physicists, mathematicians, and computer scientists are brought together. Some particular topics of investigation are: signal transduction, gene regulatory networks, multicellular patterning, chemotaxis, systems neuroscience, the evolution of networks, and the effect of stochastic noise at the organism level.

=== International Projects ===
==== Reconstitution of cell polarity and axis determination in a cell-free system ====
Cell polarity is a prerequisite for several fundamental operations in animal cells, such as asymmetric cell division and morphogenesis. For both of these, polarization is determined by the same set of proteins, known as PAR proteins. It is not known how these proteins set polarity. The investigators have proposed a dual approach, combining in vitro and cell extract techniques. The goal is to gain knowledge about the micrometer scale behavior of the polarizing system, as well as the attributes of its components.

==== Methods for high-resolution analysis of generic effects on gene expression ====
Many of the common genetic signals associated with disease are found far from the DNA sequence that encodes for protein sequence. It is probable that they play a role in regulating gene expression. In this project, the investigators develop methodologies that will explore the effects of genetic variation in gene expression.

==== Risk prediction in age-related diseases ====
This program studies major changes in contemporary society and its concomitant risks. This project integrates molecular, cellular, computational and systems biology approaches in model organisms and human diseases to study the genetic causes of age-related sicknesses. One aim is to create new diagnostic and therapeutic techniques.

=== Core Facilities ===
==== Advanced Light Microscopy Unit ====
The Advanced Light Microscopy Unit provides instruments that cover the entire application spectrum of advanced light microscopy. Equipment for sample preparation and maintenance are under the responsibility of this unit. Support is also ensured during the processing, rendering, and analysis of the acquired datasets.

Available technology covers: super-resolution microscopy, two photon microscopy, confocal microscopy, total internal reflection fluorescence microscopy, fluorescence lifetime imaging microscopy, microinjection, microdissection, image processing and analysis, and other areas.

==== Bioinformatics Unit ====
The Bioinformatics Unit grants researchers services of consultation, experiment planning, data processing, software and database development, bioinformatics training, and access to high-performance computing resources.

Among the services offered are: sample handling and sequencing, grant proposal development, variant detection in genomics, quality assessment of assemblies, analysis of high-throughput data, identification of microbial and fungi communities from sequences, and protein functional annotation.

==== Tissue Engineering Unit ====
The goal of the Tissue Engineering Unit is to provide researchers with cutting-edge technologies for stem cell biology, stem cell differentiation, organoid formation, and induced pluripotent stem cells. This unit collaborates with the Biomolecular Screening & Protein Technologies Unit for genome editing technology services.

== See also ==
- European Genome-phenome Archive
