= Evolution of human intelligence =

Evolution-related timelines

The evolution of human intelligence is closely tied to the evolution of the human brain and to the origin of language. The timeline of human evolution spans approximately seven million years, from the separation of the genus Pan until the emergence of behavioral modernity by 50,000 years ago. The first three million years of this timeline concern Sahelanthropus, the following two million concern Australopithecus and the final two million span the history of the genus Homo in the Paleolithic era.

Many traits of human intelligence, such as empathy, theory of mind, mourning, ritual, and the use of symbols and tools, are somewhat apparent in other great apes, although they are observed in much less sophisticated forms than what is found in humans.

== History ==
=== Hominidae ===
Hominin timeline
← / Earlier apes; ← / Gorilla split; ← / Chimpanzee split; ← / Earliest bipedal; ← / Earliest sign of Ardipithecus; ← / Earliest sign of Australopithecus; ← / Earliest stone tools; ← / Earliest sign of Homo; ← / Dispersal beyond Africa; ← / Earliest fire / cooking; ← / Earliest rock art; ← / Earliest clothes; ← / Modern humans
(million years ago)

The great apes (Hominidae) show some cognitive and empathic abilities. Chimpanzees can make tools and use them to acquire foods and for social displays; they have mildly complex hunting strategies requiring cooperation, influence and rank; they are status conscious, manipulative and capable of deception; they can learn to use symbols and understand aspects of human language including some relational syntax, concepts of number and numerical sequence. One common characteristic that is present in species of "high degree intelligence" (i.e. dolphins, great apes, and humans - Homo sapiens) is a brain of enlarged size. Additionally, these species have a more developed neocortex, a folding of the cerebral cortex, and von Economo neurons. Said neurons are linked to social intelligence and the ability to gauge what another is thinking or feeling and are also present in bottlenose dolphins.

=== Homininae ===
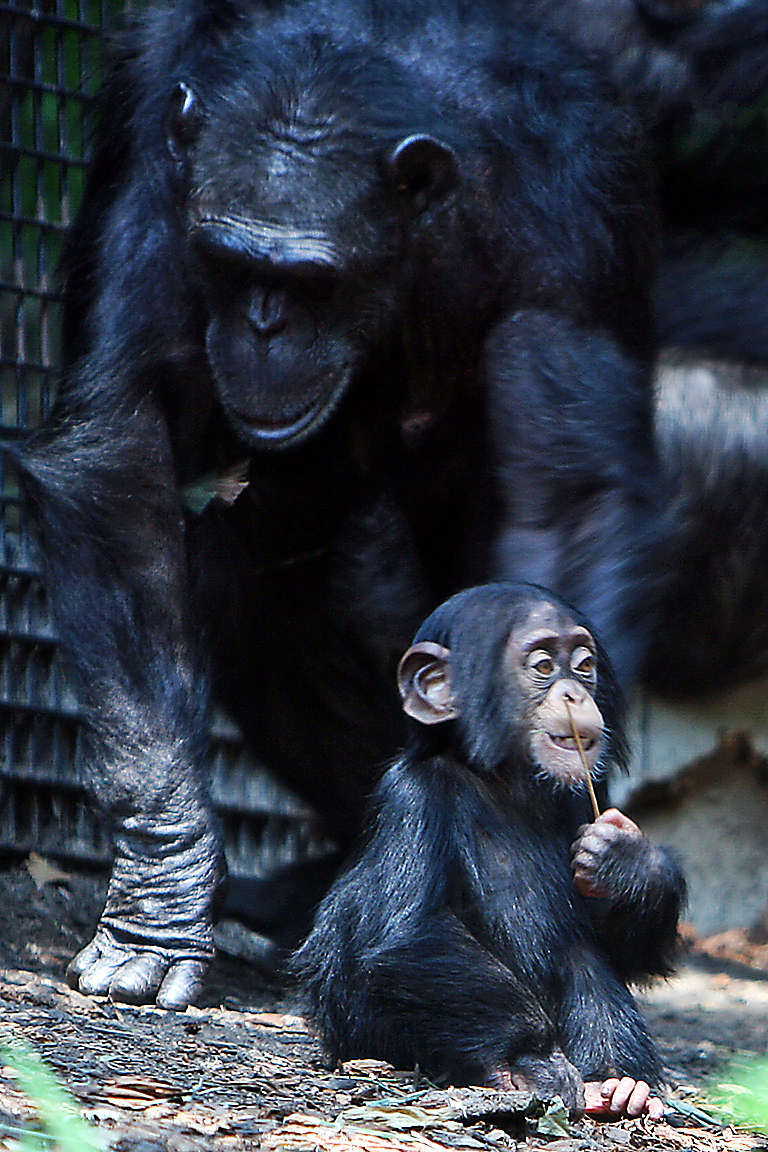
Chimpanzee mother and baby

Around 10 million years ago, the Earth's climate entered a cooler and drier phase, which led eventually to the Quaternary glaciation beginning some 2.6 million years ago. One consequence of this was that the north African tropical forest began to retreat, being replaced first by open grasslands and eventually by desert (the modern Sahara). As their environment changed from continuous forest to patches of forest separated by expanses of grassland, some primates adapted to a partly or fully ground-dwelling life where they were exposed to predators, such as the big cats, from whom they had previously been safe.

These environmental pressures caused selection to favor bipedalism - walking on hind legs. This gave the Homininae's eyes greater elevation, the ability to see approaching danger further off, and a more efficient means of locomotion. It also freed their arms from the task of walking and made the hands available for tasks such as gathering food. At some point the bipedal primates developed handedness, giving them the ability to pick up sticks, bones and stones and use them as weapons, or as tools for tasks such as killing smaller animals, cracking nuts, or cutting up carcasses. In other words, these primates developed the use of primitive technology. Bipedal tool-using primates from the subtribe Hominina date back to as far as about 5 to 7 million years ago, such as one of the earliest species, Sahelanthropus tchadensis.

From about 5 million years ago, the hominin brain began to develop rapidly in both size and differentiation of function. There has been a gradual increase in brain volume as humans progressed along the timeline of evolution (see Homininae), starting from about 600 cm^{3} in Homo habilis up to 1500 cm^{3} in Homo neanderthalensis. Thus, in general there's a positive correlation between brain volume and intelligence. However, modern Homo sapiens have a brain volume slightly smaller (1250 cm^{3}) than neanderthals, and the Flores hominids (Homo floresiensis), nicknamed hobbits, had a cranial capacity of about 380 cm^{3} (considered small for a chimpanzee) about a third of that of Homo erectus. It is proposed that they evolved from H. erectus as a case of insular dwarfism. With their three-times-smaller brain, the Flores hominids apparently used fire and made tools as sophisticated as those of their ancestor H. erectus.

=== Homo ===
Roughly 2.4 million years ago Homo habilis had appeared in East Africa: the first known human species, and the first known to make stone tools, yet the disputed findings of signs of tool use from even earlier ages and from the same vicinity as multiple Australopithecus fossils may put to question how much more intelligent than its predecessors H. habilis was.

The use of tools conferred a crucial evolutionary advantage, and required a larger and more sophisticated brain to co-ordinate the fine hand movements required for this task. Our knowledge of the complexity of behaviour of Homo habilis is not limited to stone culture; they also had habitual therapeutic use of toothpicks.

A larger brain requires a larger skull, and thus is accompanied by other morphological and biological evolutionary changes. One such change required for the female to have a wider birth canal for the newborn's larger skull to pass through. The solution to this was to give birth at an early stage of fetal development, before the skull grew too large to pass through the birth canal. Other accompanying adaptations were the smaller maxillary and mandibular bones, smaller and weaker facial muscles, and shortening and flattening of the face resulting in modern-human's complex cognitive and linguistic capabilities as well as the ability to create facial expressions and smile. Consequentially, dental issues in modern humans arise from these morphological changes that are exacerbated by a shift from nomadic to sedentary lifestyles.

Humans' increasingly sedentary lifestyle to protect their more vulnerable offspring led them to grow even more dependent on tool-making to compete with other animals and other humans, and rely less on body size and strength.

About 200,000 years ago Europe and the Middle East were colonized by Neanderthals, extinct by 39,000 years ago following the appearance of modern humans in the region from 40,000 to 45,000 years ago.

History of humans

In the Late Pliocene, hominins were set apart from modern great apes and other closely related organisms by the anatomical evolutionary changes resulting in bipedalism, or the ability to walk upright. Characteristics such as a supraorbital torus, or prominent eyebrow ridge, and flat face also makes Homo erectus distinguishable. Their brain size substantially sets them apart from closely related species, such as H. habilis, as seen by an increase in average cranial capacity of 1000 cc. Compared to earlier species, H. erectus developed keels and small crests in the skull showing morphological changes of the skull to support increased brain capacity. It is believed that Homo erectus were, anatomically, modern humans as they are very similar in size, weight, bone structure, and nutritional habits. Over time, however, human intelligence developed in phases that is interrelated with brain physiology, cranial anatomy and morphology, and rapidly changing climate and environments.

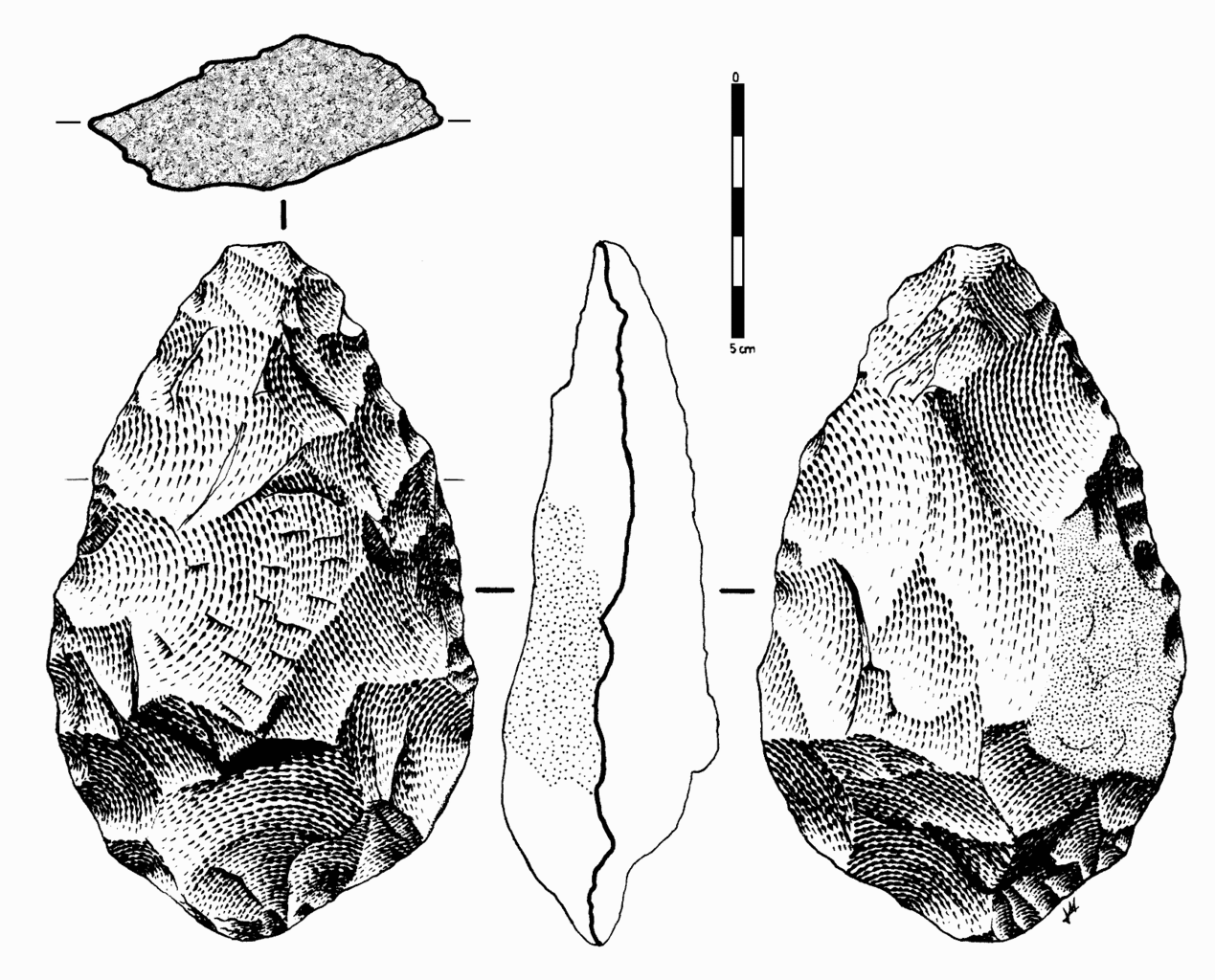
Drawing of Acheulean handaxe from Spain from front, back, side, and top profile

==== Tool-use ====
The study of the evolution of cognition relies on the archaeological record made up of assemblages of material culture, particularly from the Paleolithic Period, to make inferences about our ancestors' cognition. Paleo-anthropologists from the past half-century have had the tendency of reducing stone tool artifacts to physical products of the metaphysical activity taking place in the brains of hominins. Recently, a new approach called 4E cognition (see Models for other approaches) has been developed by cognitive archaeologists Lambros Malafouris, Thomas G. Wynn, and Karenleigh A. Overmann, to move past the "internal" and "external" dichotomy by treating stone tools as objects with agency in both providing insight to hominin cognition and having a role in the development of early hominin cognition. The 4E cognition approach describes cognition as embodied, embedded, enactive, and extended, to understand the interconnected nature between the mind, body, and environment.

There are four major categories of tools created and used throughout human evolution that are associated with the corresponding evolution of the brain and intelligence. Stone tools such as flakes and cores used by Homo habilis for cracking bones to extract marrow, known as the Oldowan culture, make up the oldest major category of tools from about 2.5 and 1.6 million years ago. The development of stone tool technology suggests that our ancestors had the ability to hit cores with precision, taking into account the force and angle of the strike, and the cognitive planning and capacity to envision a desired outcome.

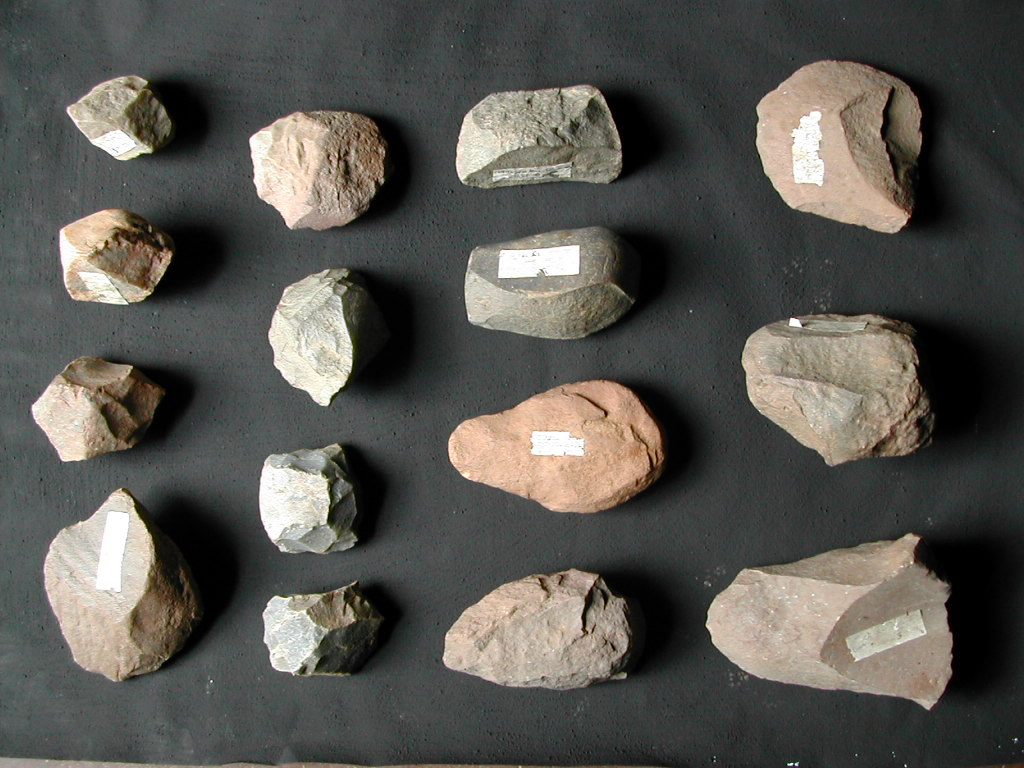
Stone tools from the Paleolithic Period, also known as the Stone Age, are indicative of cognitive advancements throughout human evolutionary history.

Acheulean culture, associated with Homo erectus, is composed of bifacial, or double-sided, hand-axes, that "requires more planning and skill on the part of the toolmaker; he or she would need to be aware of principles of symmetry". In addition, some sites show evidence that selection of raw materials involved travel, advanced planning, cooperation, and thus communication with other hominins.

The third major category of tool industry marked by its innovation in tool-making technique and use is the Mousterian culture. Compared to previous tool cultures, in which tools were regularly discarded after use, Mousterian tools, associated with Neanderthals, were specialized, built to last, and "formed a true toolkit". The making of these tools, called the Levallois technique, involves a multi-step process which yields several tools. In combination with other data, the formation of this tool culture for hunting large mammals in groups evidences the development of speech for communication and complex planning capabilities.

While previous tool cultures did not show great variation, the tools of early modern Homo sapiens are robust in the amount of artifacts and diversity in utility. There are several styles associated with this category of the Upper Paleolithic, such as blades, boomerangs, atlatls (spear throwers), and archery made from varying materials of stone, bone, teeth, and shell. Beyond use, some tools have been shown to have served as signifiers of status and group membership. The role of tools for social uses signal cognitive advancements such as complex language and abstract relations to things.

=== Homo sapiens ===
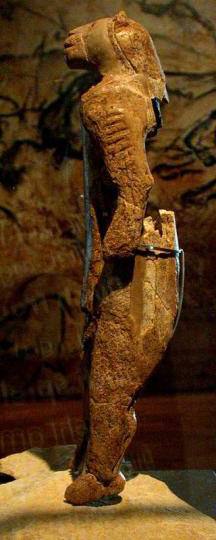
The "Lion-man", found in the Hohlenstein-Stadel cave of Germany's Swabian Alb and dated to 40,000 years ago, is associated with the Aurignacian culture and is the oldest known anthropomorphic animal figurine in the world.

Dates approximate, consult articles for details
(From 2,000,000 BC to 2013 AD in (partial) exponential notation)
See also: Java Man (−1.75e+06), Yuanmou Man (−1.75e+06: -0.73e+06),
Lantian Man (−1.7e+06), Nanjing Man (- 0.6e+06), Tautavel Man (- 0.5e+06),
Peking Man (- 0.4e+06), Solo Man (- 0.4e+06), and Peștera cu Oase (- 0.378e+05)

==== Homo sapiens intelligence ====
The eldest findings of Homo sapiens in Jebel Irhoud, Morocco date back c. 300,000 years Fossils of Homo sapiens were found in East Africa which are c. 200,000 years old. It is unclear to what extent these early modern humans had developed language, music, religion, etc. The cognitive tradeoff hypothesis proposes that there was an evolutionary tradeoff between short-term working memory and complex language skills over the course of human evolution.

According to proponents of the Toba catastrophe theory, the climate in non-tropical regions of the earth experienced a sudden freezing about 70,000 years ago, because of a huge explosion of the Toba volcano that filled the atmosphere with volcanic ash for several years. This reduced the human population to less than 10,000 breeding pairs in equatorial Africa, from which all modern humans are descended. Being unprepared for the sudden change in climate, the survivors were those intelligent enough to invent new tools and ways of keeping warm and finding new sources of food (for example, adapting to ocean fishing based on prior fishing skills used in lakes and streams that became frozen).

Around 80,000–100,000 years ago, three main lines of Homo sapiens diverged, bearers of mitochondrial haplogroup L1 (mtDNA) / A (Y-DNA) colonizing Southern Africa (the ancestors of the Khoisan/Capoid peoples), bearers of haplogroup L2 (mtDNA) / B (Y-DNA) settling Central and West Africa (the ancestors of Niger–Congo and Nilo-Saharan speaking peoples), while the bearers of haplogroup L3 remained in East Africa.

The "Great Leap Forward" leading to full behavioral modernity sets in only after this separation. Rapidly increasing sophistication in tool-making and behaviour is apparent from about 80,000 years ago, and the migration out of Africa follows towards the very end of the Middle Paleolithic, some 60,000 years ago. Fully modern behaviour, including figurative art, music, self-ornamentation, trade, burial rites etc. is evident by 30,000 years ago. The oldest unequivocal examples of prehistoric art date to this period, the Aurignacian and the Gravettian periods of prehistoric Europe, such as the Venus figurines and cave painting (Chauvet Cave) and the earliest musical instruments (the bone pipe of Geissenklösterle, Germany, dated to about 36,000 years ago).

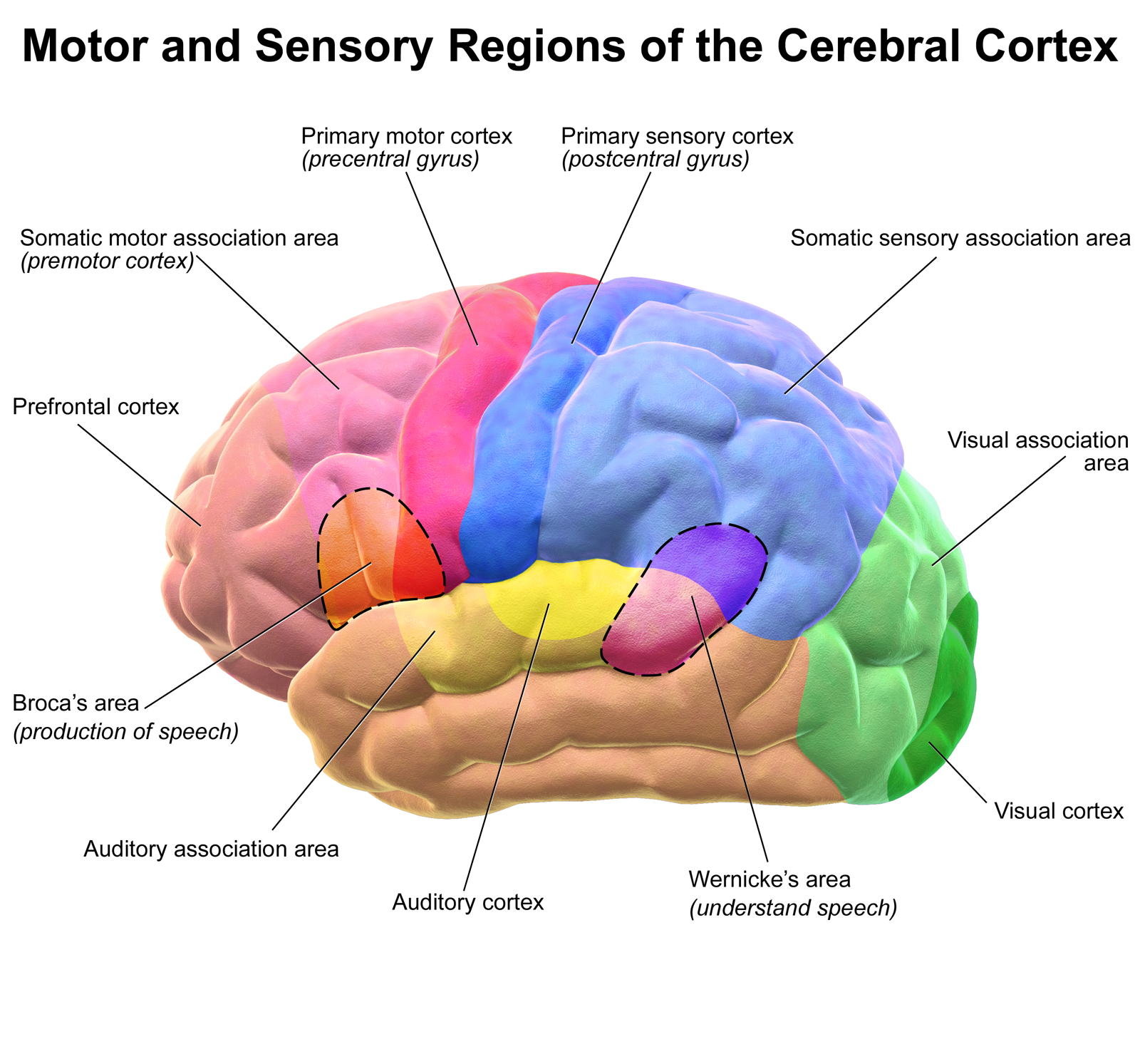
Motor and sensory areas of the cerebral cortex; dashed areas shown are commonly left hemisphere dominant.

The human brain has evolved gradually over the passage of time; a series of incremental changes occurring as a result of external stimuli and conditions. It is crucial to keep in mind that evolution operates within a limited framework at a given point in time. In other words, the adaptations that a species can develop are not infinite and are defined by what has already taken place in the evolutionary timeline of a species. Given the immense anatomical and structural complexity of the brain, its evolution (and the congruent evolution of human intelligence), can only be reorganized in a finite number of ways. The majority of said changes occur either in terms of size or in terms of developmental timeframes.

The cerebral cortex is divided into four lobes (frontal, parietal, occipital, and temporal) each with specific functions. The cerebral cortex is significantly larger in humans than in any other animal and is responsible for higher thought processes such as reasoning, abstract thinking, and decision making. Another characteristic that sets humans apart from any other species is our ability to produce and understand complex, syntactic language. The cerebral cortex, particularly in the temporal, parietal, and frontal lobes, are populated with neural circuits dedicated to language. There are two main areas of the brain commonly associated with language, namely: Wernicke's area and Broca's area. The former is responsible for the understanding of speech and the latter for the production of speech. Homologous regions have been found in other species (i.e. Area 44 and 45 have been studied in chimpanzees) but they are not as strongly related to or involved in linguistic activities as in humans.

== Models ==
=== Massive modularity of mind ===
Each card has a number on one side, and a patch of color on the other. Which card or cards must be turned over to test the idea that if a card shows an even number on one face, then its opposite face is blue?

Each card has an age on one side, and a drink on the other. Which card or cards must be turned over to test the idea that if someone is drinking alcohol then they must be over 18?

In 2004, psychologist Satoshi Kanazawa argued that g was a domain-specific, species-typical, information processing psychological adaptation, and in 2010, Kanazawa argued that g correlated only with performance on evolutionarily unfamiliar rather than evolutionarily familiar problems, proposing what he termed the "Savanna-IQ interaction hypothesis". In 2006, Psychological Review published a comment reviewing Kanazawa's 2004 article by psychologists Denny Borsboom and Conor Dolan that argued that Kanazawa's conception of g was empirically unsupported and purely hypothetical and that an evolutionary account of g must address it as a source of individual differences. In response to Kanazawa's 2010 article, psychologists Scott Barry Kaufman, Colin G. DeYoung, Deirdre Reis, and Jeremy R. Gray gave 112 subjects a 70-item computerized version of the Wason selection task (a logic puzzle) in a social relations context as proposed by Leda Cosmides and John Tooby in The Adapted Mind, and found instead that "performance on non-arbitrary, evolutionarily familiar problems is more strongly related to general intelligence than performance on arbitrary, evolutionarily novel problems".

Peter Cathcart Wason originally demonstrated that not even 10% of subjects found the correct solution and his finding was replicated. Psychologists Patricia Cheng, Keith Holyoak, Richard E. Nisbett, and Lindsay M. Oliver demonstrated experimentally that subjects who have completed semester-long college courses in propositional calculus do not perform better on the Wason selection task than subjects who do not complete such college courses. Tooby and Cosmides originally proposed a social relations context for the Wason selection task as part of a larger computational theory of social exchange after they began reviewing the previous experiments about the task beginning in 1983. Despite other experimenters finding that some contexts elicited more correct subject responses than others, no theoretical explanation for differentiating between them was identified until Tooby and Cosmides proposed that disparities in subjects performance on contextualized versus non-contextualized variations of the task was an artifact of the task measuring a specialized cheater-detection module. Tooby and Cosmides later noted that whether there are evolved cognitive mechanisms for the content-blind rules of logical inference is disputed, and consistently noted that a body of research about the Wason selection task had concluded that cognitive adaptations for social exchange were not a by-product of general-purpose reasoning mechanisms, domain-general learning mechanisms, or g.

Relatedly, economist Thomas Sowell has noted that numerous studies finding disparities between the mean test scores of ethnic groups on intelligence tests have found that ethnic groups with lower mean test scores have tended to perform worst on spatial, non-verbal, or abstract reasoning test items. Writing after the completion of the Human Genome Project in 2003, psychologist Earl B. Hunt noted in 2011 that no genes related to differences in cognitive skills across various racial and ethnic groups had ever been discovered. In 2012, American Psychologist published a review by Nisbett, psychologists Joshua Aronson, Clancy Blair, Diane F. Halpern, and Eric Turkheimer, economist William Dickens, and philosopher James R. Flynn of findings since the publication of the 1995 American Psychological Association report on intelligence that concluded that almost no single-nucleotide genetic polymorphisms that have been discovered are consistently associated with variation in IQ in the normal range, and that adoption research on race and intelligence showed that differences could be entirely accounted for by environmental factors. In 2021, subsequent research using polygenic scores for educational attainment and cognitive performance in African and European samples from the 1000 Genomes Project found no evidence of divergent selection by race and a statistically insignificant contribution to racial differences in IQ.

Flynn had argued earlier that the Flynn effect presented multiple paradoxes for g as a psychological trait with a heritable basis because the increases in the statistical average scores among later birth year cohorts born in the 20th century were occurring without sufficient increases in vocabulary size, general knowledge, and ability to solve arithmetical problems, and that the increases were so large that they would imply that the statistically average members of the birth year cohorts in the late 19th century and early 20th century (the Lost Generation and the Greatest Generation) would have been intellectually disabled (as well as more distant human ancestors). Hunt noted that the latter paradox would imply that half of the soldiers who served in the U.S. military during World War II would not pass the Armed Services Vocational Aptitude Battery in 2008. Flynn proposed that these paradoxes could be answered by the increasing use of abstraction, logic, and scientific reasoning to address problems, while Nisbett argued that the Flynn effect was largely attributable to increases in formal education among human populations during the 20th century.

In 2010, psychologist David Marks found through 8 statistical analyses that average population IQ scores across race, time, and nationality correlated with literacy rates between a range of 0.79 and 0.99, which led to the conclusion that both the Flynn effect and racial differences in mean scores on intelligence tests were statistical artifacts of uncontrolled variation in literacy rates due to test performance requiring literacy. However, in reference to theoretical issues with constructivism in mathematics education and the failure of whole language in literacy education, psychologist David C. Geary and cognitive scientist Steven Pinker have noted that literacy, numeracy, and formal mathematical and logical reasoning are not inherited traits but biologically secondary cognitive skills (i.e. acquired characteristics) that require extensive practice after formal, explicit, and direct instruction—in contrast with natural language and number sense, since language acquisition and numerosity develop automatically and unconsciously due to specialized neurobiological systems for language and numerical cognition which the biologically secondary cognitive skills lack. In research on Broca's area, Pinker and coauthors reconfirmed the findings about the visual word form area (VWFA) of cognitive neuroscientist Stanislas Dehaene, who proposed the neuronal recycling hypothesis as an explanation for the VWFA and the associations between the parietal lobe and intraparietal sulcus in mental arithmetic with numeral systems. Pinker and Geary also reference Dehaene's research on the development of arithmetical skills, dyscalculia, and acalculia.

Pinker has also noted that writing is not a cultural universal since writing systems were independently invented only a few times in human history and most societies documented by ethnographers lacked writing systems, while literacy rates in European countries did not begin to exceed 50 percent until the 17th century since the movable-type printing press was not invented until the 15th century. Similarly to the lack of improvement in performance on the Wason selection task by college students that take courses in propositional calculus, Pinker referenced the response by professional mathematicians and statisticians to the solution to the Monty Hall problem published in Parade in 1990 in noting the dominance of automatic processes over controlled processes for formal logical reasoning following the dual process model proposed by psychologists Daniel Kahneman and Amos Tversky. While Pinker has suggested that the evolution of human intelligence could be explained by intelligence itself being the product of metaphor (stemming from the ability to create arbitrary morphemes) and combinatorial grammar (allowing nesting of verb phrases in syntax) that together enable the infinite composition of sentences, Pinker has also argued that the Flynn effect is likely caused by increased amounts of formal education in addition to other factors.

Noting that Kaufman and psychologist Robert Sternberg identified a lack of consensus about how to define human intelligence, psychologists Jay Joseph and Ken Richardson have argued that the construct validity of intelligence tests is questionable due to definitions of intelligence being based on the intuitions of psychologists, that tests measure formal education more than innate intelligence because test items are included because of how such items reflect academic performance, and that the Flynn effect provides evidence against heritability causing even within-group differences in general intelligence due to the confounding effect of shared birth dates and nationalities between pairs of identical twins reared apart from different generations in test performance. While Hunt defended the methodology of twin and adoption research in behavioral genetics, Hunt also noted that the only candidate genes behavioral geneticists had proposed being related to g were associated with below average IQ scores and that none had been identified that were associated with above average IQ scores.

Although Hunt expressed some reservations about the construct validity of g (referencing the research of psychologist Louis Leon Thurstone) and acknowledged the impact of literacy on IQ test performance, Hunt defended the fluid and crystallized intelligence models of g in psychometrics, and argued that alternatives to psychometric models (such as the theory of multiple intelligences and the triarchic theory of intelligence) lacked empirical support. Hunt also argued that research on the evolution of the brain showed evidence for g as a general problem-solving mechanism. Conversely, Pinker has argued that research in cognitive neuroscience has shown that the brain is more characterized by functional specialization. While Geary has attempted to integrate g with evolutionary psychology, Tooby, Cosmides, and Pinker have all argued that the human mind is better understood as a system of dedicated intelligences and domain-specific learning systems that are adaptively specialized rather than characterized by a general intelligence factor and a domain-general learning system that enables the passive cultural learning and socialization of a blank slate.

Tooby and Cosmides suggested that the human mind does have a domain-general, content-independent, and general-purpose improvisational intelligence that resembles general intelligence, and which possibly evolved to generate solutions in novel situations where the dedicated intelligences did not produce an optimal response. However, in light of the frame problem and combinatorial explosion in artificial intelligence and because all adaptations require selection pressure from recurrent problems, Tooby and Cosmides argue that a complete blank slate mind entirely shaped by general intelligence following the standard social science model is not computationally capable of performing the cognitive tasks or solving the adaptive problems that the human mind evolved to perform and solve, such as visual perception, language acquisition, recognizing emotional expressions, mate choice, cultural learning, and cheater-detection in social exchange.

=== Social brain hypothesis ===
The social brain hypothesis was proposed by British anthropologist Robin Dunbar, who argues that human intelligence did not evolve primarily as a means to solve ecological problems, but rather as a means of surviving and reproducing in large and complex social groups. Some of the behaviors associated with living in large groups include reciprocal altruism, deception, and coalition formation. These group dynamics relate to Theory of Mind or the ability to understand the thoughts and emotions of others, though Dunbar himself admits in the same book that it is not the flocking itself that causes intelligence to evolve (as shown by ruminants).

Dunbar argues that when the size of a social group increases, the number of different relationships in the group may increase by orders of magnitude. Chimpanzees live in groups of about 50 individuals whereas humans typically have a social circle of about 150 people, which is also the typical size of social communities in small societies and personal social networks; this number is now referred to as Dunbar's number. In addition, there is evidence to suggest that the success of groups is dependent on their size at foundation, with groupings of around 150 being particularly successful, potentially reflecting the fact that communities of this size strike a balance between the minimum size of effective functionality and the maximum size for creating a sense of commitment to the community. According to the social brain hypothesis, when hominids started living in large groups, selection favored greater intelligence. As evidence, Dunbar cites a relationship between neocortex size and group size of various mammals.

==== Criticism ====
Phylogenetic studies of brain sizes in primates show that while diet predicts primate brain size, sociality does not predict brain size when corrections are made for cases in which diet affects both brain size and sociality. The exceptions to the predictions of the social intelligence hypothesis, which that hypothesis has no predictive model for, are successfully predicted by diets that are either nutritious but scarce or abundant but poor in nutrients. Researchers have found that frugivores tend to exhibit larger brain size than folivores. One potential explanation for this finding is that frugivory requires "extractive foraging", or the process of locating and preparing hard-shelled foods, such as nuts, insects, and fruit. Extractive foraging requires higher cognitive processing, which could help explain larger brain size. However, other researchers argue that extractive foraging was not a catalyst in the evolution of primate brain size, demonstrating that some non primates exhibit advanced foraging techniques. Other explanations for the positive correlation between brain size and frugivory highlight how the high-energy, frugivore diet facilitates fetal brain growth and requires spatial mapping to locate the embedded foods.

Meerkats have far more social relationships than their small brain capacity would suggest. Another hypothesis is that it is actually intelligence that causes social relationships to become more complex, because intelligent individuals are more difficult to learn to know.

There are also studies that show that Dunbar's number is not the upper limit of the number of social relationships in humans either.

The hypothesis that it is brain capacity that sets the upper limit for the number of social relationships is also contradicted by computer simulations that show simple unintelligent reactions to be sufficient to emulate "ape politics" and by the fact that some social insects such as the paper wasp do have hierarchies in which each individual has its place (as opposed to herding without social structure) and maintains their hierarchies in groups of approximately 80 individuals with their brains smaller than that of any mammal.

Insects provide an opportunity to explore this since they exhibit an unparalleled diversity of social forms to permanent colonies containing many individuals working together as a collective organism and have evolved an impressive range of cognitive skills despite their small nervous systems. Social insects are shaped by ecology, including their social environment. Studies aimed to correlating brain volume to complexity have failed to identify clear correlations between sociality and cognition because of cases like social insects. In humans, societies are usually held together by the ability of individuals to recognize features indicating group membership. Social insects, likewise, often recognize members of their colony allowing them to defend against competitors. Ants do this by comparing odors which require fine discrimination of multicomponent variable cues. Studies suggest this recognition is achieved through simple cognitive operations that do not involve long-term memory but through sensory adaptation or habituation. In honeybees, their symbolic 'dance' is a form of communication that they use to convey information with the rest of their colony. In an even more impressive social use of their dance language, bees indicate suitable nest locations to a swarm in search of a new home. The swarm builds a consensus from multiple 'opinions' expressed by scouts with different information, to finally agree on a single destination to which the swarm relocates.

=== Cultural intelligence hypothesis ===
==== Overview ====
Similar to, but distinct from the social brain hypothesis, is the cultural intelligence or cultural brain hypothesis, which dictates that human brain size, cognitive ability, and intelligence have increased over generations due to cultural information from a mechanism known as social learning. The hypothesis also predicts a positive correlation between species with a higher dependency and more frequent opportunities for social learning and overall cognitive ability. This is because social learning allows species to develop cultural skills and strategies for survival; in this way it can be said that heavily cultural species should in theory be more intelligent.

Humans have been widely acknowledged as the most intelligent species on the planet, with big brains with ample cognitive abilities and processing power which outcompete all other species. In fact, humans have shown an enormous increase in brain size and intelligence over millions of years of evolution. This is because humans have been referred to as an 'evolved cultural species'; one that has an unrivalled reliance on culturally transmitted knowledge due to the social environment around us. This is down to social transmission of information which spreads significantly faster in human populations relative to changes in genetics. Put simply, humans are the most cultural species there is, and are therefore the most intelligent species there is. The key point when concerning evolution of intelligence is that this cultural information has been consistently transmitted across generations to build vast amounts of cultural skills and knowledge throughout the human race. Dunbar's social brain hypothesis on the other hand dictates that our brains evolved primarily due to complex social interactions in groups, so in this way the two hypotheses are distinct from each other in that the cultural intelligence hypothesis focuses more on an in increase in intelligence from socially transmitted information. A shift in focus from 'social' interactions to learning strategies can be seen through this. The hypothesis can also be seen to contradict the idea of human 'general intelligence' by emphasising the process of cultural skills and information being learned from others.

In 2018, Muthukrishna and researchers constructed a model based on the cultural intelligence hypothesis which revealed relationships between brain size, group size, social learning and mating structures. The model had three underlying assumptions:

1. Brain size, complexity and organisation were grouped into one variable
2. A larger brain results in larger capacity for adaptive knowledge
3. More adaptive knowledge increases fitness of organisms

Using evolutionary simulation, the researchers were able to confirm the existence of hypothesised relationships. Results concerning the cultural intelligence hypothesis model showed that larger brains can store more information and adaptive knowledge, thus supporting larger groups. This abundance of adaptive knowledge can then be used for frequent social learning opportunities.

==== Further empirical evidence ====
As previously mentioned, social learning is the foundation of the cultural intelligence hypothesis and can be described simplistically as learning from others. It involves behaviours such as imitation, observational learning, influences from family and friends and explicit teaching from others. What sets humans apart from other species is that, due to our emphasis on culturally acquired information, humans have evolved to already possess significant social learning abilities from infancy. Neurological studies on nine month old infants were conducted by researchers in 2012 to demonstrate this phenomenon. The study involved infants observing a caregiver making a sound with a rattle over a period of one week. The brains of the infants were monitored throughout the study. Researchers found that the infants were able to activate neural pathways associated with making a sound with the rattle without actually doing the action themselves, showing human social learning in action- infants were able to understand the effects of a particular action simply by observing the performance of the action by someone else. Not only does this study demonstrate the neural mechanisms of social learning, but it also demonstrates our inherent ability to acquire cultural skills from those around us from the very start of our lives- it therefore shows strong support for the cultural intelligent hypothesis.

Various studies have been conducted to show the cultural intelligence hypothesis in action on a wider scale. One particular study in 2016 investigated two orangutan species, including the more social Sumatran species and the less sociable Bornean species. The aim was to test the notion that species with a higher frequency of opportunities for social learning should evolve to be more intelligent. Results showed that the Sumatrans consistently performed better in cognitive tests compared to the less sociable Borneans. The Sumatrans also showed greater inhibition and more cautious behaviour within their habitat. This was one of the first studies to show evidence for the cultural intelligence hypothesis in a non human species- frequency of learning opportunities had gradually produced differences in cognitive abilities between the two species.

==== Transformative cultural intelligence hypothesis ====
A study in 2018 proposed an altered variant of the original version of the hypothesis called the 'transformative cultural intelligence hypothesis'. The research involved investigating four year old's problem solving skills in different social contexts. The children were asked to extract a floating object from a tube using water. Nearly all were unsuccessful without cues, however most children succeeded after being shown a pedagogical solution suggesting video. When the same video was shown in a non pedagogical manner however, the children's success in the task did not improve. Crucially, this meant that the children's physical cognition and problem solving ability was therefore affected by how the task was socially presented to them. Researchers thus formulated the transformative cultural intelligence hypothesis, which stresses that our physical cognition is developed and affected by the social environment around us. This challenges the traditional cultural intelligence hypothesis which states that it is human's social cognition and not physical cognition which is superior to our nearest primate relatives; showing unique physical cognition in humans affected by external social factors. This phenomenon has not been seen in other species.

=== Reduction in aggression ===
Another theory that tries to explain the growth of human intelligence is the reduced aggression theory (aka self-domestication theory). According to this strand of thought, what led to the evolution of advanced intelligence in Homo sapiens was a drastic reduction of the aggressive drive. This change separated us from other species of monkeys and primates, where this aggressivity is still in plain sight, and eventually lead to the development of quintessential human traits such as empathy, social cognition, and culture. This theory has received strong support from studies of animal domestication where selective breeding for tameness has, in only a few generations, led to the emergence of impressive "humanlike" abilities. Tamed foxes, for example, exhibit advanced forms of social communication (following pointing gestures), pedomorphic physical features (childlike faces, floppy ears) and even rudimentary forms of theory of mind (eye contact seeking, gaze following). Evidence also comes from the field of ethology (which is the study of animal behavior, focused on observing species in their natural habitat rather than in controlled laboratory settings) where it has been found that animals with a gentle and relaxed manner of interacting with each other – for example stumptailed macaques, orangutans and bonobos – have more advanced socio-cognitive abilities than those found among the more aggressive chimpanzees and baboons. It is hypothesized that these abilities derive from a selection against aggression.

On a mechanistic level, these changes are believed to be the result of a systemic downregulation of the sympathetic nervous system (the fight-or-flight reflex). Hence, tamed foxes show a reduced adrenal gland size and have an up to fivefold reduction in both basal and stress-induced blood cortisol levels. Similarly, domesticated rats and guinea pigs have both reduced adrenal gland size and reduced blood corticosterone levels. It seems as though the neoteny of domesticated animals significantly prolongs the immaturity of their hypothalamic-pituitary-adrenal system (which is otherwise only immature for a short period when they are pups/kittens) and this opens up a larger "socialization window" during which they can learn to interact with their caretakers in a more relaxed way.

This downregulation of sympathetic nervous system reactivity is also believed to be accompanied by a compensatory increase in a number of opposing organs and systems. Although these are not as well specified, various candidates for such "organs" have been proposed: the parasympathetic system as a whole, the septal area over the amygdala, the oxytocin system, the endogenous opioids and various forms of quiescent immobilization which antagonize the fight-or-flight reflex.

=== Sexual selection ===
This model, which invokes sexual selection, is proposed by Geoffrey Miller who argues that human intelligence is unnecessarily sophisticated for the needs of hunter-gatherers to survive. He argues that the manifestations of intelligence such as language, music and art did not evolve because of their utilitarian value to the survival of ancient hominids. Rather, intelligence may have been a fitness indicator. Hominids would have been chosen for greater intelligence as an indicator of healthy genes and a Fisherian runaway positive feedback loop of sexual selection would have led to the evolution of human intelligence in a relatively short period. Philosopher Denis Dutton also argued that the human capacity for aesthetics evolved by sexual selection.

Evolutionary biologist George C. Williams and evolutionary psychiatrist Randolph M. Nesse cite evolutionary psychologists John Tooby and Leda Cosmides as referring to the emotions as "Darwinian algorithms of the mind", while social psychologist David Buss has argued that the sex-specialized differences in the emotion of jealousy are adaptive strategies for detecting infidelity by a mating partner and anthropologists Donald E. Brown and Ward Goodenough have argued that marriage is a cultural universal that evolved to regulate sexual access to fertile women within a particular culture in response to male intrasexual competition and dominance. Citing cross-cultural research conducted by Buss, Miller has argued that if humans prefer altruistic mating partners that would select by mate choice for altruism directly. Additionally, Nesse and theoretical biologist Mary Jane West-Eberhard view sexual selection as a subcategory of social selection, with Nesse and anthropologist Christopher Boehm arguing further that altruism in humans held fitness advantages that enabled evolutionarily extraordinary cooperativeness and the human capability of creating culture, as well as capital punishment by band societies against bullies, thieves, free-riders, and psychopaths.

In many species, only males have impressive secondary sexual characteristics such as ornaments and show-off behavior, but sexual selection is also thought to be able to act on females as well in at least partially monogamous species. With complete monogamy, there is assortative mating for sexually selected traits. This means that less attractive individuals will find other less attractive individuals to mate with. If attractive traits are good fitness indicators, this means that sexual selection increases the genetic load of the offspring of unattractive individuals. Without sexual selection, an unattractive individual might find a superior mate with few deleterious mutations, and have healthy children that are likely to survive. With sexual selection, an unattractive individual is more likely to have access only to an inferior mate who is likely to pass on many deleterious mutations to their joint offspring, who are then less likely to survive.

Sexual selection is often thought to be a likely explanation for other female-specific human traits, for example breasts and buttocks far larger in proportion to total body size than those found in related species of ape. It is often assumed that if breasts and buttocks of such large size were necessary for functions such as suckling infants, they would be found in other species. That human female breasts (typical mammalian breast tissue is small) are found sexually attractive by many men is in agreement with sexual selection acting on human females secondary sexual characteristics.

Sexual selection for intelligence and judging ability can act on indicators of success, such as highly visible displays of wealth. Growing human brains require more nutrition than brains of related species of ape. It is possible that for females to successfully judge male intelligence, they must be intelligent themselves. This could explain why despite the absence of clear differences in intelligence between males and females on average, there are clear differences between male and female propensities to display their intelligence in ostentatious forms.

==== Critique ====
The sexual selection by the disability principle/fitness display model of the evolution of human intelligence is criticized by certain researchers for issues of timing of the costs relative to reproductive age. While sexually selected ornaments such as peacock feathers and moose antlers develop either during or after puberty, timing their costs to a sexually mature age, human brains expend large amounts of nutrients building myelin and other brain mechanisms for efficient communication between the neurons early in life. These costs early in life build facilitators that reduce the cost of neuron firing later in life, and as a result the peaks of the brain's costs and the peak of the brain's performance are timed on opposite sides of puberty with the costs peaking at a sexually immature age while performance peaks at a sexually mature age. Critical researchers argue the above shows that the cost of intelligence is a signal which reduces the chance of surviving to reproductive age, and does not signal fitness of sexually mature individuals. Since the disability principle is about selection from disabilities in sexually immature individuals, which increases the offspring's chance of survival to reproductive age, disabilities would be selected against and not for by the above mechanism. These critics argue that human intelligence evolved by natural selection citing that unlike sexual selection, natural selection have produced many traits that cost the most nutrients before puberty including immune systems and accumulation and modification for increased toxicity of poisons in the body as a protective measure against predators.

=== Intelligence as a disease-resistance sign ===
The number of people with severe cognitive impairment caused by childhood viral infections like meningitis, protists like Toxoplasma and Plasmodium, and animal parasites like intestinal worms and schistosomes is estimated to be in the hundreds of millions. Even more people with moderate mental damages, such as an inability to complete difficult tasks, that are not classified as 'diseases' by medical standards, may still be considered as inferior mates by potential sexual partners.

Thus, widespread, virulent, and archaic infections are greatly involved in natural selection for cognitive abilities. People infected with parasites may have brain damage and obvious maladaptive behavior in addition to visible signs of disease. Smarter people can more skillfully learn to distinguish safe non-polluted water and food from unsafe kinds and learn to distinguish mosquito infested areas from safe areas. Additionally, they can more skillfully find and develop safe food sources and living environments. Given this situation, preference for smarter child-bearing/rearing partners increases the chance that their descendants will inherit the best resistance alleles, not only for immune system resistance to disease, but also smarter brains for learning skills in avoiding disease and selecting nutritious food. When people search for mates based on their success, wealth, reputation, disease-free body appearance, or psychological traits such as benevolence or confidence; the effect is to select for superior intelligence that results in superior disease resistance.

=== Ecological dominance-social competition model ===
Another model describing the evolution of human intelligence is ecological dominance-social competition (EDSC), explained by Mark V. Flinn, David C. Geary and Carol V. Ward based mainly on work by Richard D. Alexander. According to the model, human intelligence was able to evolve to significant levels because of the combination of increasing domination over habitat and increasing importance of social interactions. As a result, the primary selective pressure for increasing human intelligence shifted from learning to master the natural world to competition for dominance among members or groups of its own species.

As advancement, survival and reproduction within an increasing complex social structure favored ever more advanced social skills, communication of concepts through increasingly complex language patterns ensued. Since competition had shifted bit by bit from controlling "nature" to influencing other humans, it became of relevance to outmaneuver other members of the group seeking leadership or acceptance, by means of more advanced social skills. A more social and communicative person would be more easily selected.

=== Intelligence dependent on brain size ===
Human intelligence is developed to an extreme level that is not necessarily adaptive in an evolutionary sense. Firstly, larger-headed babies are more difficult to give birth to and large brains are costly in terms of nutrient and oxygen requirements. Thus the direct adaptive benefit of human intelligence is questionable at least in modern societies, while it is difficult to study in prehistoric societies. Since 2005, scientists have been evaluating genomic data on gene variants thought to influence head size, and have found no evidence that those genes are under strong selective pressure in current human populations. The trait of head size has become generally fixed in modern human beings.

While decreased brain size has strong correlation with lower intelligence in humans, some modern humans have brain sizes as small as with Homo erectus but normal intelligence (based on IQ tests) for modern humans. Increased brain size in humans may allow for greater capacity for specialized expertise.

==== Expanded cortical regions ====
The two major perspectives on primate brain evolution are the concerted and mosaic approaches. In the concerted evolution approach, cortical expansions in the brain are considered to be a by-product of a larger brain, rather than adaptive potential. Studies have supported the concerted evolution model by finding cortical expansions between macaques and marmosets are comparable to that of humans and macaques. Researchers attribute this result to the constraints on the evolutionary process of increasing brain size. In the mosaic approach, cortical expansions are attributed to their adaptive advantage for the species. Researchers have attributed hominin evolution to mosaic evolution.

Simian primate brain evolution studies show that specific cortical regions associated with high-level cognition have demonstrated the greatest expansion over primate brain evolution. Sensory and motor regions have showcased limited growth. Three regions associated with complex cognition include the frontal lobe, temporal lobe, and the medial wall of the cortex. Studies demonstrate that the enlargement in these regions is disproportionately centered in the temporoparietal junction (TPJ), lateral prefrontal cortex (LPFC), and anterior cingulate cortex (ACC). The TPJ is located in the parietal lobe and is associated with morality, theory of mind, and spatial awareness. Additionally, the Wernicke's area is located in the TPJ. Studies have suggested that the region assists in language production, as well as language processing. The LPFC is commonly associated with planning and working memory functions. The Broca's area, the second major region associated with language processing, is also located in the LPFC. The ACC is associated with detecting errors, monitoring conflict, motor control, and emotion. Specifically, researchers have found that the ACC in humans is disproportionately expanded when compared to the ACC in macaques.

Fossils show that although Homo sapiens' total brain volume approached modern levels as early as 300,000 years ago, parietal lobes and cerebella grew relative to total volume after this point, reaching current levels of variation at some point between the approximate dates of 100,000 and 35,000 years ago.

Studies on cortical expansions in the brain have been used to examine the evolutionary basis of neurological disorders, such as Alzheimer's disease. For example, researchers associate the expanded TPJ region with Alzheimer's disease. However, other researchers found no correlation between expanded cortical regions in the human brain and the development of Alzheimer's disease.

=== Cellular, genetic, and circuitry changes ===
Human brain evolution involves cellular, genetic, and circuitry changes. On a genetic level, humans have a modified FOXP2 gene, which is associated with speech and language development. The human variant of the gene SRGAP2, SRGAP2C, enables greater dendritic spine density which fosters greater neural connections. On a cellular level, studies demonstrate von Economo neurons (VENs) are more prevalent in humans than other primates. Studies show that VENs are associated with empathy, social awareness and self-control. Studies show that the striatum plays a role in understanding reward and pair-bond formation. On a circuitry level, humans exhibit a more complex mirror neuron system, greater connection between the two major language processing areas (Wernicke's area and Broca's area), and a vocal control circuit that connects the motor cortex and brain stem. The mirror neuron system is associated with social cognition, theory of mind, and empathy. Studies have demonstrated the presence of the mirror neuron system in both macaques in humans; However, the mirror neuron system is only activated in macaques when observing transitive movements.

=== Group selection ===
Group selection theory contends that organism characteristics that provide benefits to a group (clan, tribe, or larger population) can evolve despite individual disadvantages such as those cited above. The group benefits of intelligence (including language, the ability to communicate between individuals, the ability to teach others, and other cooperative aspects) have apparent utility in increasing the survival potential of a group.

In addition, the theory of group selection is inherently tied to Darwin's theory of natural selection. Specifically, that "group-related adaptations must be attributed to the natural selection of alternative groups of individuals and that the natural selection of alternative alleles within populations will be opposed to this development".

Between-group selection can be used to explain the changes and adaptations that arise within a group of individuals. Group-related adaptations and changes are a byproduct of between-group selection as traits or characteristics that prove to be advantageous in relation to another group will become increasingly popular and disseminated within a group. In the end, increasing its overall chance of surviving a competing group.

However, this explanation cannot be applied to humans (and other species, predominantly other mammals) that live in stable, established social groupings. This is because of the social intelligence that functioning within these groups requires from the individual. Humans, while they are not the only ones, possess the cognitive and mental capacity to form systems of personal relationships and ties that extend well beyond those of the nucleus of family. The continuous process of creating, interacting, and adjusting to other individuals is a key component of many species' ecology.

These concepts can be tied to the social brain hypothesis, mentioned above. This hypothesis posits that human cognitive complexity arose as a result of the higher level of social complexity required from living in enlarged groups. These bigger groups entail a greater amount of social relations and interactions thus leading to an expanded quantity of intelligence in humans. However, this hypothesis has been under academic scrutiny in recent years and has been largely disproven. In fact, the size of a species' brain can be much better predicted by diet instead of measures of sociality as noted by the study conducted by DeCasien et al. They found that ecological factors (such as: folivory/frugivory, environment) explain a primate brain size much better than social factors (such as: group size, mating system).

=== Nutritional status ===
Early hominins dating back to pre 3.5 Ma in Africa ate primarily plant foods supplemented by insects and scavenged meat. Their diets are evidenced by their 'robust' dento-facial features of small canines, large molars, and enlarged masticatory muscles that allowed them to chew through tough plant fibers. Intelligence played a role in the acquisition of food, through the use of tool technology such as stone anvils and hammers.

There is no direct evidence of the role of nutrition in the evolution of intelligence dating back to Homo erectus, contrary to dominant narratives in paleontology that link meat-eating to the appearance of modern human features such as a larger brain. However, scientists suggest that nutrition did play an important role, such as the consumption of a diverse diet including plant foods and new technologies for cooking and processing food such as fire.

Diets deficient in iron, zinc, protein, iodine, B vitamins, omega 3 fatty acids, magnesium and other nutrients can result in lower intelligence either in the mother during pregnancy or in the child during development. While these inputs did not have an effect on the evolution of intelligence they do govern its expression. A higher intelligence could be a signal that an individual comes from and lives in a physical and social environment where nutrition levels are high, whereas a lower intelligence could imply a child, its mother, or both, come from a physical and social environment where nutritional levels are low. Previc emphasizes the contribution of nutritional factors to elevations of dopaminergic activity in the brain, which may have been responsible for the evolution of human intelligence since dopamine is crucial to working memory, cognitive shifting, abstract, distant concepts, and other hallmarks of advanced intelligence.

== See also ==
- Behavioral modernity
- Cetacean intelligence
- Cephalopod intelligence
- Denisovan
- Human evolution
- Human intelligence
- Primate cognition
- Timeline of human evolution
- Noosphere – Philosophical concept of biosphere successor via humankind's rational activities
