= Cotton ginner =

There are two species of gecko named cotton ginner:

- Sphaerodactylus macrolepis
- Sphaerodactylus grandisquamis
