= Sensory drive hypothesis =

The sensory drive hypothesis is a hypothesis in population ecology that posits that when local environmental conditions differ between conspecific populations, communication systems will adapt to these conditions. Sensory drive predicts that both communication signals and perceptual systems will adapt to these local environmental conditions. Divergence will then occur based on the intensity and direction of selection on the mating signals and on the sensory systems acquiring information regarding predators, prey, and potential mates.

The sensory drive hypothesis has two primary assumptions. The first is that greater sensory stimulation results in preferences for mates with the stimulating trait, meaning exaggerated traits are expected to have greater signal value and generate more mating because they cause a stronger response from the sensory system. In this sense, it is possible for sensory drive to contribute to the formation of runaway traits when sexual selection is working in the same direction as the sensory biases. The second assumption is that biases are relatively fixed and show limited developmental plasticity.

Mating signals, perceptual systems, and behavioral responses are not independent. As a result, as one of these diverges based on selective pressures, the others should also diverge unless under independent selection against divergence. While sensory drive is likely not the primary driver involved in speciation, it is able to set the initial evolutionary trajectory of an aspect involved in these communication signals that can be acted on by evolutionary forces to drive speciation.

To find support for the sensory drive hypothesis, there needs to be a match between the biases of the sensory system predicted by environmental constraints and a match between signals and that sensory bias. As of 2018, support has been found for the sensory component with there being a strong bias towards aquatic systems (57% of studies) and visual signals (83% of studies). There is also support for the signal component with more bias towards terrestrial systems (71% of studies) and visual signals (57% of studies). There have also been papers focused on identifying support for both the sensory and signal components; of these papers, only those with support for the sensory drive hypothesis have been published. Similar to the studies focusing on the sensory component, there is a bias towards aquatic systems (62% of studies) and visual signals (86% of studies) with the majority of these being focused on fish taxa (55% of studies).

== Visual signals and vision ==
In a typical vertebrate eye, light passes through the ocular media (cornea, lens, and vitreous humor) before reaching the retina, where it passes through several layers of cells before finally reaching the photoreceptors. Transmission properties in each layer vary according to wavelength. One study found that cone cell sensitivities vary between individual guppies, which influenced Endler's original hypothesis in 1992. Scientists do not yet understand how color preferences are impacted by this variation. Additionally, UV waves may be transmitted through the eye differently in different individuals and/or populations; this has been documented in birds, especially warblers. This may be selectively advantageous for a species if its predator is incapable of seeing UV wavelengths, allowing for conspecific communication without drawing attention from predators. Sensory drive could explain differences in UV preference if properties of the ocular media are not uniform between populations. For example, two closely related species of Anolis lizards differ such that the males of the species that is more sensitive to UV wavelengths reflect UV light on their dewlaps (used for signaling to mates) more than the males of the species that is less sensitive to this light. In general, marine organisms tend to have a greater capacity for visual tuning than terrestrial vertebrates, which could partially explain why most of the studies that find evidence of sensory drive focus on aquatic systems.

There is a great diversity of colors in the animal kingdom, which is potentially explained by color perception and how the environment drives its evolution. One aspect of this is color contrast (when an object's color appears to be different when seen in front of varied backgrounds). For instance, an animal will perceive the color of a yellow bird differently when it is viewed in front of a dark brown tree trunk versus a bright blue sky. This connection between environment and detection is an integral part of the sensory drive hypothesis.

Three mechanisms for the evolution of visual perception have been proposed relating perception, signal, and environmental factors. The first ignores the effects of environmental conditions and proposes that color and perception traits coevolve as a result of social selection, e.g., females' preferences for certain colors in males. For more on this, see Fisherian runaway. The second mechanism also predicts coevolution of color and perception, but the direction of evolution is influenced by environmental factors, according to the sensory drive hypothesis. For a given male trait, the strength of female preference depends on the honesty of the trait in conveying the male's quality and the detectability of the trait. Variation in detectability is expected to significantly influence color diversification; this variation often is due to the features of the habitat occupied by the population in question. Even if males' colors accurately represent their quality as a mate, poor visibility as a result of environmental factors could result in females choosing males of poorer quality. This could lead to the evolution of preferences for other, more easily detected, male characteristics. The final mechanism proposes that evolution carries on linearly, without any feedback loops: environmental conditions define the selective pressures that change color perception, which in turn drives the evolution of colors. The most obvious example of this is found when analyzing the need for organisms to detect and hide from predators and prey.

The amount of visible light as well as the range of colors in water decreases sharply with depth and other abiotic and biotic factors that contribute to turbidity. Studies have found that these gradients correlate with several color perception traits, including those related to opsins. For example, in surfperch living in kelp forests, natural selection has likely favored refined color discrimination, which allows for easier detection of prey against the background. Sensory drive explains male cichlid coloration and female preference in Lake Victoria, where the light gradient is highly predictable. Threespine sticklebacks (Gasterosteus spp.) are another example of coevolution of male signals and female perception driven by environmental factors. Males either display red or black nuptial colors, and there is a direct correlation between female sensitivity to red light and preference for red males. Since such steep gradients of light availability and quality are not observed in terrestrial environments, it is less likely to find support for sensory drive here as well as in aquatic environments that are less optically constrained.

In cichlids and guppies, opsin expression can be explained both by phenotypic plasticity and genotypic variation between populations and species, though scientists have not yet determined which is more important. One problem for future work to address is that it is difficult to link genotypes for opsin tuning and expression with behavioral phenotypes, which is a key component of the sensory drive hypothesis.

== Acoustic signals and hearing ==
The auditory systems of animals are impacted by both the biotic and abiotic conditions in their environment. Under conditions of high background noise, there is evidence of perceptual tuning to better perceive and respond to conspecific signals. For example, in anurans (frogs and toads) there is evidence of perceptual tuning of the inner ear sensitivity to best perceive conspecifics and to prevent hybridization. Additionally in anurans, there is evidence for perceptual tuning contributing to directional selection on acoustic signals.

An organism's auditory system can also be tuned to perceive signals produced by both prey and predators. For example, by an organism's perceptual tuning to perceive echolocating bats. This anti-predator strategy is also seen in some spider systems, such as Deinopis spinosa, which have evolved higher perceptual capabilities to perceive avian predator cues. In addition, there is evidence that predator species will use auditory cues to detect prey items as well as parasitoid wasps that can detect host cricket species.

Acoustic signals are considered to be most affected by biotic noise rather than abiotic noise compared to other signal modalities. In a study of tropical bird species, it was determined that divergence in bird song during the dawn chorus was more strongly predicted by the composition of competing songs rather than phylogenetic relatedness or physical location. This has also been tested and agreed upon in insects and frogs, as well as other bird systems.

Evidence for sensory drive in acoustic signaling and perception is lower than that in visual signaling. In a recent meta-analysis, they determined that of the studies showing no support for sensory drive, 95% of them were testing the acoustic signal modality. However, of the studies testing the sensory drive hypothesis in acoustic signaling, only two tested both components of sensory drive (signal and sensory). The majority of acoustic studies tested the signal component of sensory drive and there were many fewer studies testing the sensory component, suggesting this is an understudied modality. Support for both components of the sensory drive hypothesis has been identified in birds, specifically Parus major, and frogs, specifically Amolops tormotus. In both cases, background noise is the driver underlying the sensory biases contributing to sensory drive and signal divergence.

There is also support in acoustic systems for sensory drive contributing to speciation and the diversification of lineages. For example, the Paragalago zanzibaricus species complex shows support for speciation by sensory drive by looking at responses to conspecific and heterospecific signals and ear morphology. Additionally, a study in tropical birds found that habitat characteristics predict acoustic divergence, suggesting sensory drive is playing a role in this divergence and potentially reproductive isolation

== Chemical signals and chemosensation ==
Chemical signals are among the most prevalent signal modalities, but there is a lack of research focusing on sensory drive in this modality. This is likely driven by three main complications when studying chemosensation: complex chemical backgrounds, complex chemical signals, and complex genetic basis for chemosensation.

Recent work has discovered that chemical signals, similar to the other modalities discussed, are also affected by environmental conditions. Under higher temperatures, chemical signals travel faster but also fade faster. Similarly, in nutrient rich or chemically complex environments, chemical signal detection can be greatly decreased. These signals can also be subject to different interferences such as masking by other chemicals, disruption of the biological signaling pathway, or interference with the chemosensor

The majority of support for sensory drive in chemosensation is considered a by-product of research that is not explicitly exploring sensory drive. For example, in the Podarcis hispanicus species complex divergent environmental conditions (cold and humid vs. wet and dry) have led to divergence in the chemical composition of the signals. This divergence is likely to contribute to producing more efficient and stable signals in their respective environments. These signals are used to mark male territory and attract female mates and both males and females show stronger responses to the conspecific signals from their respective environments. While this is only a single example, this modality may be more important for sensory drive and the process of speciation than the lack of literature suggests.
