= Michael Muthukrishna =

Professor of economic psychology

Michael Muthukrishna is a professor of economic psychology at the London School of Economics and Political Science (LSE), in England. He is an affiliate of the Developmental Economics Group at the LSE's STICERD, technical director of UBC's Database of Religious History, and CIFAR's Azrieli Global Scholar in the Boundaries, Membership and Belonging;programme. His main area of interest is the application of research in cultural evolution to public policy.

== Research ==
Muthukrishna's research addresses three main areas:

1. Exploring the unique aspects that distinguish humans from other animals
2. Investigating the underlying psychological and evolutionary mechanisms driving cultural and social change
3. Applying insights gained from these questions to address global challenges

His research employs a dual methodology involving mathematical and computational modeling as well as experimental and data science techniques from psychology and economics. The resulting "Theory of Human Behavior" informs various areas, including innovation, corruption, the emergence of large-scale cooperation, and cross-cultural navigation.

== Key contributions ==
=== Cultural brain hypothesis ===
Muthukrishna has played a pivotal role in the development and advancement of the cultural brain hypothesis. His research in 2018 involved the construction of a model that was firmly rooted in this hypothesis, shedding light on critical relationships among brain size, group size, social learning, and mating structures.

Muthukrishna's work was instrumental in formulating this model, which operated based on three fundamental assumptions:

1. Combining brain size, complexity, and organization into a single variable
2. Establishing that a larger brain equates to a greater capacity for acquiring adaptive knowledge
3. Demonstrating that an increase in adaptive knowledge enhances the fitness of organisms

Through evolutionary simulations, Muthukrishna and his colleagues were able to validate the existence of the hypothesized relationships. Their findings with regard to the cultural brain hypothesis model showed that larger brains have the ability to store more information and adaptive knowledge, thereby supporting the existence of larger social groups.

=== Collective brain ===
In 2016, Muthukrishna and Joseph Henrich explored the concept that cultural evolution and progress are not solely dependent on individual intelligence but also heavily reliant on collective intelligence and transmissions. They argued that while individual intelligence is important, it is the rapid advancement of human culture, technology, and knowledge driven by culmulative efforts and knowledge. They proposed that as information and innovations accumulate, subsequent generations build upon this knowledge base, leading to exponential growth in understanding and problem-solving abilities.

Their research emphasises that human intelligence is not limited to individual cognitive abilities but is deeply rooted in the collective intelligence of societies. The ability to preserve and build upon the knowledge of previous generations plays a vital role in driving human progress, particularly in areas such as technology, science, and social organization.

=== Cultural distances and "WEIRD" populations ===
Muthukrishna is a critic of the methodology within psychological research related to issues with bias and poor sampling for research populations. He emphasises the need to expand the scope of research to include more diverse populations from different cultures and backgrounds to reduce bias and subjectivity of results when only considering samples that are WEIRD (Western-Educated-Industrialised-Rich-Democratic).

Muthukrisna provides context and a solution for this issue in a 2020 paper, where he introduces the concept of "cultural distance" and "psychological distance" as measures to quantify the differences between populations. Cultural distance refers to the dissimilarity in cultural norms, values, and practices between groups, while psychological distance assesses the variations in cognitive processes, emotions, and behavior.

He and his colleagues have argued that a generalised theory of human behavior requires theoretical and empirical understanding of humans across the globe and across the life span, which can be achieved through the use of cultural distance metrics. The results of his research suggest humans have more similarities in culture than differences, and he provides a tool to measure the cultural distances between different countries. His aim through doing so is to guide researchers in selecting sites and samples that are sufficiently culturally different to test the generalizability of their hypotheses.

=== Culturalytik – measuring and analysing cultural diversity ===
Muthukrishna has made substantial contributions to the field of cultural evolution, particularly in its application to public policy and real-world problem-solving . His work has led to the development of Culturalytik, a platform designed for cultural measurement, analysis, and the creation of behavioral interventions.

Culturalytik's distinctive feature lies in its utilization of advanced methodologies to accurately identify and analyse culturally significant aspects. Muthukrishna and his team's primary objective was to recognize and safeguard vital elements of culture, aiming to optimize knowledge retention, stimulate innovation, enhance customer satisfaction, improve key performance indicators, and facilitate global expansion initiatives.

== Awards ==
Muthukrishna has received a number of awards for his contribution to the field of behavioural science and cultural evolution:

- 2016: PhD Dissertation Excellence Award, Canadian Psychological Association
- 2016 CGS/ProQuest Distinguished Dissertation Award in the Social Sciences
- 2021 CIFAR Azrieli Global Scholar, Canadian Institute for Advanced Research (CIFAR)
- 2021 APS Rising Star, Association of Psychological Science (APS)
- 2022 SAGE Emerging Scholar Award, Society for Personality and Social Psychology (SPSP)
- 2023 HBES Early Career Award for Distinguished Scientific Contribution, Human Behavior and Evolution Society (HBES)
- 2023 HBES Rising Star Award, Human Behavior and Evolution Society (HBES)

== Publications ==
=== Books ===
A Theory of Everyone: Who We Are, How We Got Here, and Where We're Going (ISBN 9781399810630) (2023)

The book offers a multidisciplinary framework that delves into human behavior, culture, and society. Muthukrishna suggests that our unique cultural capacity differentiates us from other life forms. He advocates applying life principles like energy dynamics, innovation, cooperation, and evolution to overcome 21st-century challenges, including polarization, inequality, productivity stagnation, and energy crises.

=== Journal articles ===
- Muthukrishna, M. and Henrich, J. (2019). A problem in theory. Nature Human Behaviour, 3(3), pp. 221–229. https://doi.org/10.1038/s41562-018-0522-1.
- Muthukrishna, M., Bell, A.V., Henrich, J., Curtin, C.M., Gedranovich, A., McInerney, J. and Thue, B. (2020). Beyond Western, Educated, Industrial, Rich, and Democratic (WEIRD) Psychology: Measuring and Mapping Scales of Cultural and Psychological Distance. Psychological Science, 31(6), p. 095679762091678. https://doi.org/10.1177/0956797620916782.
- Muthukrishna, M. and Henrich, J. (2016). Innovation in the collective brain. Philosophical Transactions of the Royal Society B: Biological Sciences, 371(1690), p. 20150192. https://doi.org/10.1098/rstb.2015.0192.
- Muthukrishna, M. and Henrich, J. (2020). The Origins and Psychology of Human Cooperation. Annual Review of Psychology, 72(1). https://doi.org/10.1146/annurev-psych-081920-042106.
- Muthukrishna, M., Shulman, B.W., Vasilescu, V. and Henrich, J. (2013). Sociality influences cultural complexity. Proceedings of the Royal Society B: Biological Sciences, 281(1774), pp. 20132511–20132511. https://doi.org/10.1098/rspb.2013.2511.
