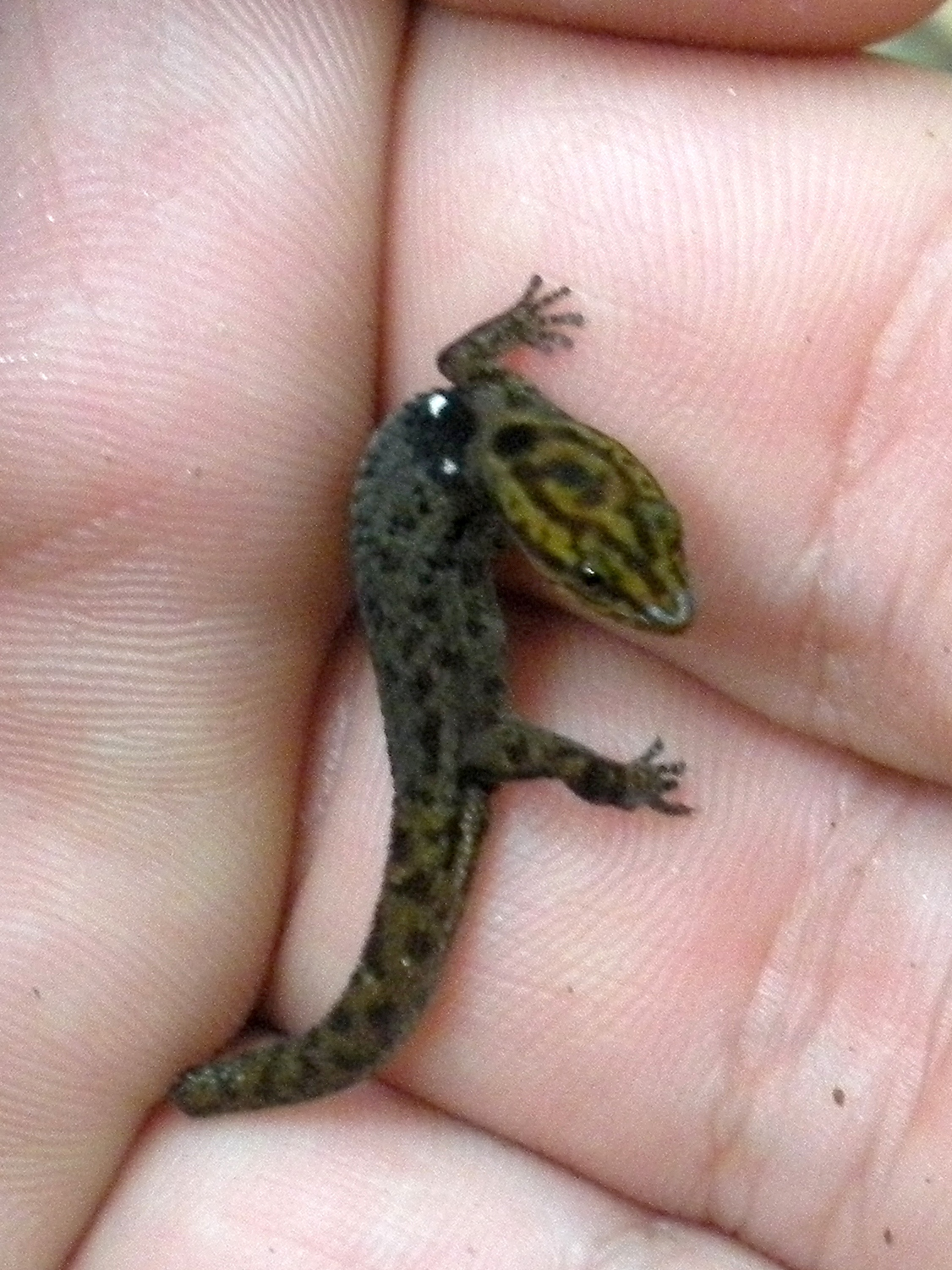
- Sphaerodactylus macrolepis

Conservation status
- Least Concern (IUCN 3.1)

Scientific classification
- Kingdom: Animalia
- Phylum: Chordata
- Class: Reptilia
- Order: Squamata
- Suborder: Gekkota
- Family: Sphaerodactylidae
- Genus: Sphaerodactylus
- Species: S. macrolepis

Binomial name
- Sphaerodactylus macrolepis Günther, 1859

Synonyms
- Sphaerodactylus imbricatus - Fischer, 1881; Sphaerodactylus danforthi - Grant, 1931

= Sphaerodactylus macrolepis =

Species of lizard

Sphaerodactylus macrolepis, also known as the big-scaled dwarf gecko or the big-scaled least gecko, is a lizard of the Sphaerodactylus genus. It was first documented in 1859 in the US Virgin Islands, specifically, St. Croix. This diurnal species has since been spotted in other locations such as Puerto Rico with major populations in Culebra.

Additionally, the big-scaled dwarf gecko displays sexual dimorphism with males being larger than females. Furthermore, size, particularly snout vent length, differs depending on the location of the lizard. Those in Puerto Rico are larger than their US Virgin Island counterparts. The big-scaled dwarf gecko is commonly seen on the forest floor of the islands, in their preferred microhabitat of leaf litter. Additionally, the species also exhibits significant sexual dichromatism in which the male and females are unique in coloration. A main difference is the colored head found in males but is lacking in females.

Another notable characteristic of the big-scaled dwarf gecko is their preference for cooler environments due to their miniature size which increases their rate of desiccation. Their total evaporative water loss grows with temperature and so these lizards' behaviors and location alters during the day in order to seek out appropriate microhabitats.

== Habitat and Distribution ==
Big-scaled dwarf geckos are endemic to various islands in the Caribbean such as Puerto Rico and the US Virgin Islands. They prefer dry, arid climates like rocky outcroppings. Due to their water retention ability, they actually thrive in dry areas and environments.

The specific microhabitats that the S. macrolepis occupy are the beach vegetation and rain forest floors. These two microhabitats do dictate certain characteristics of the lizard, with those from the coastal region being more visual attuned to higher light levels than those from the forest floor. This distinction is made clearer in the Visual acuity section in physiology.

It is also noteworthy that the S. macrolepis occupy 90% of St. Croix, being a very common sight on the island. Compared to its relative, S. beattyi, who also lives on St. Croix, the S. macrolepis lives in wetter habitats since it is more prone to desiccation.

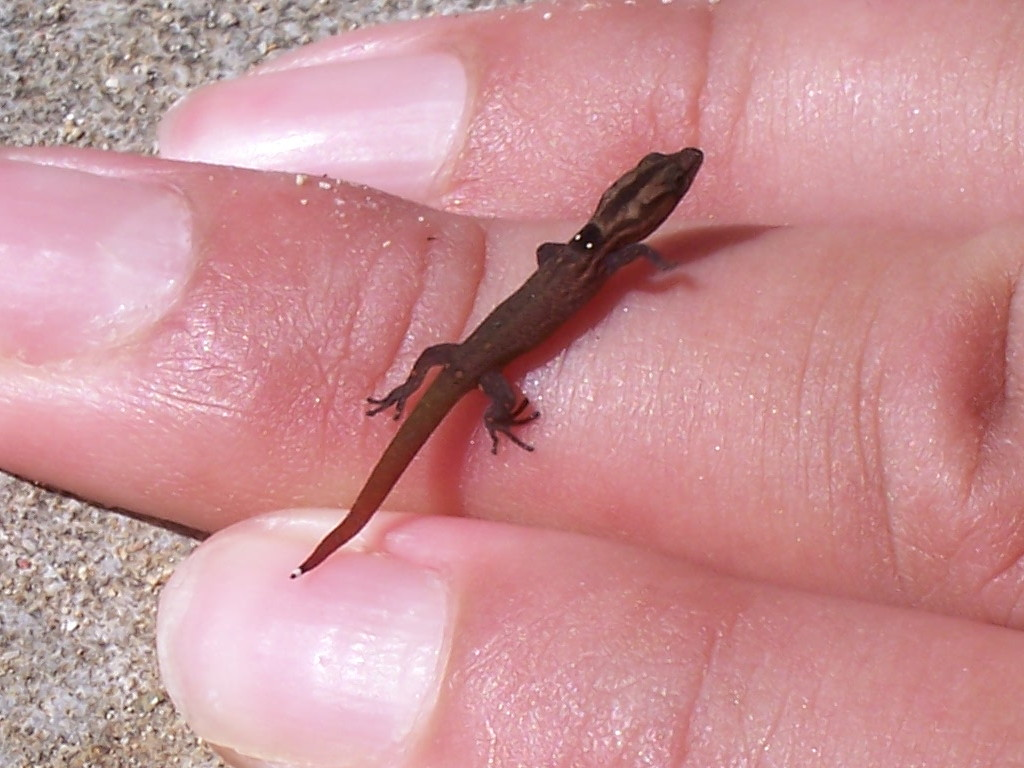
Sphaerodactylus macrolepis compared to fingers

== Description ==
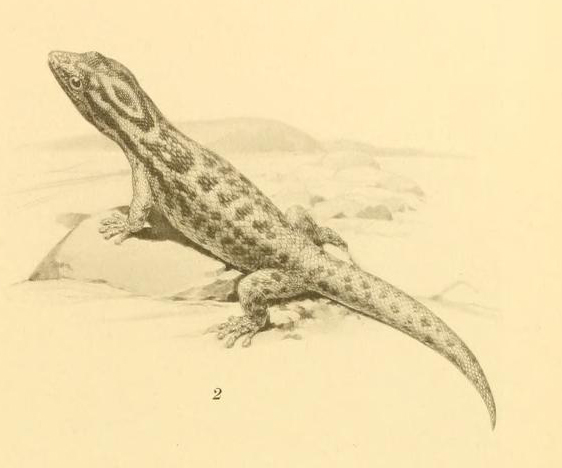

=== Body Size ===
The big-scaled dwarf gecko is extremely small in size, measuring only 0.285g as its mean mass. The lizard also maintains a snout vent length, which fluctuates from 1.7-2.7 cm with an average hitting around 2.4 cm. The largest of the big-scaled dwarf geckos are found in Puerto Rico, and those found in the Virgin Islands are smaller. In Puerto Rico, the male lizards are about 2.7 cm, hitting the high end of the big-scaled dwarf gecko's range, while the females are about 2.4 cm. As such, the big-scaled dwarf gecko displays sexual dimorphism, meaning male and female counterparts exist with obvious physical differences.

=== Appearance ===
In terms of appearance, the big-scaled dwarf gecko has its notable imbricate dorsal scales, which overlap over each other. Located in the gular region, specifically the throat, the lizard displays keeled scales. As these scales travel down the length of the body, they become smooth at around the belly region as well as at the tail. It is worth mentioning that in addition to sexual dimorphism, big-scaled dwarf geckos are sexually dichromatic, with each sex displaying a separate set of colors. Males have less patterned markings, no rings around the gular area, and have a colored head, which can differ in shade. The head can be many different colors, from blue all the way to a brownish-orange. Unlike the males, the females never exhibit this sort of coloration on their head. Females, though, have distinct markings that males lack such as the canthal line that starts at their snout and ends at their neck.

== Phylogeny ==
The big-scaled dwarf gecko, Sphaerodactylus macrolepis was first discovered in 1859 on St. Croix, a part of the US Virgin Islands. Along with its Puerto Rican counterpart, S. grandisquamis, the S. macrolepis became interchangeable with S. monensis of Mona Island. Later on, studies noted a total five species of Sphaerodactylus in the region around Puerto Rico. These species were S. grandisquamis, S. danforthi, S. monensis, S. macrolepis, and subspecie S. macrolepis parvus. Eventually, S. grandisquamis, S. danforthi, and S. macrolepis were regarded as the same. At this point, further distinction between Sphaerodactylus in different locations were made for clarification. Big-scaled dwarf geckos found on the Virgin Islands and Culebra were declared S. macrolepis macrolepis (also known as S. danforthi and S. macrolepis as a whole), and those found in Vieques were named S. macrolepis inigoi. This separation occurred due to their slightly different scale types and coloration and was not based purely on location. Lastly, it is noteworthy that the previously mentioned S. macrolepis parvus eventually became its own specie and is no longer a part of the S. macrolepis umbrella. This came about due to new morphological data, which pointed to its status as a different specie altogether.

== Diet ==
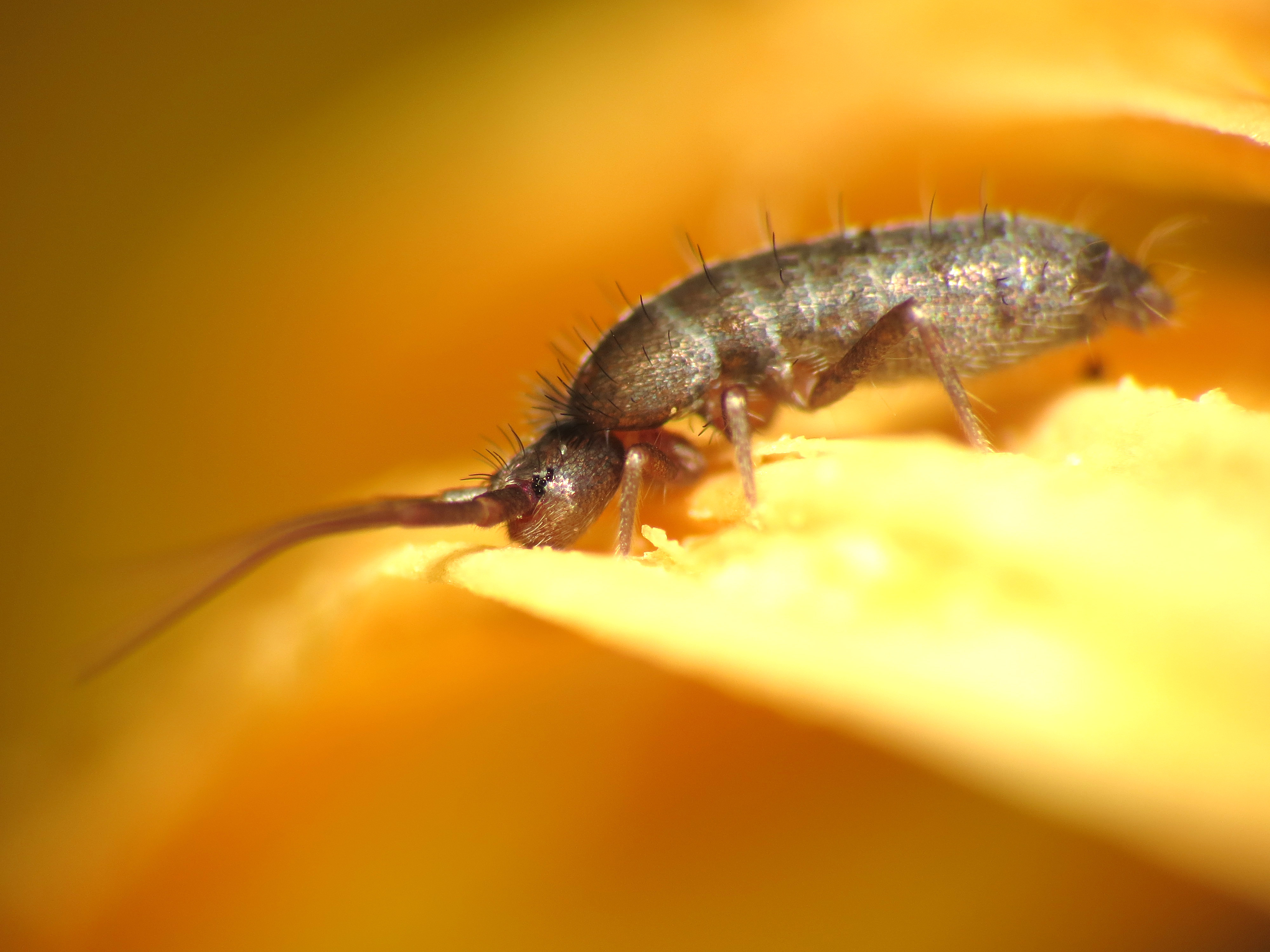
Prey of the S. macrolepis

The diet of the big-scaled dwarf gecko is mostly tiny arthropods such as springtails. Additionally, they have been documented eating drosophila fly larvae and adults.

== Reproduction and life cycle ==
=== Reproductive stress ===
Noting the small size of the big-scaled dwarf gecko, they are particularly prone to dehydration. Of the age groups, the young offspring and hatchlings are most affected by this problem. This issue can be circumvented by hatching in colder seasons.

== Enemies ==
=== Predators ===
While predation on the islands that the big-scaled dwarf gecko occupies is not extremely high, they are still hunted by other organisms such as the Anolis pelchullus, more commonly known as the Puerto Rican grass bush anole. The Puerto Rican grass bush anole is considered small by anole standards, with females measuring in at about 38mm. However, the S. macrolepis is even smaller, hence the title "dwarf". In comparison, the average big-scaled dwarf gecko sits around 20mm and is still smaller than a "small" anole. As such, predation of this sort can occur.

Additionally, it has been documented that the big-scaled dwarf gecko in the Virgin Islands region are also hunted by birds such as the bridled quail dove (Geotrygon mystacea). This predator prey relationship arises from a shared area of foraging. Both species are present on the forest floor.

Another predator of the Sphaerodactylus macrolepis is the Alsophis portoricensis, the Puerto Rican racer snake. The snake reacts with caudal luring, a type of wriggling movement when approaching prey, in the presence of S. macrolepis. This reaction is unique to this type of lizard and several other species.

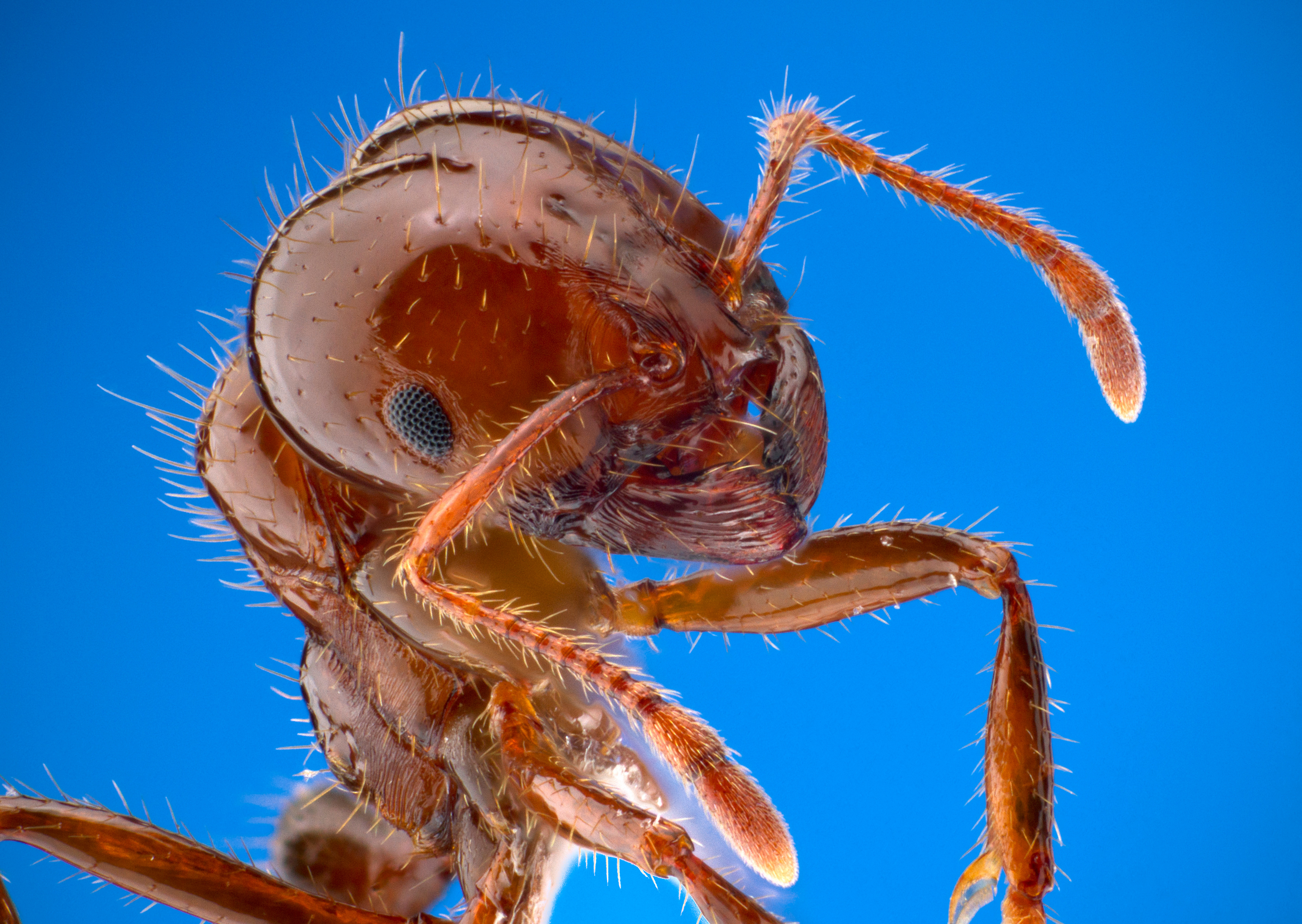
Solenopsis invicta

=== Defensive mechanisms against fire ants ===
Due to an overlap of habitats, namely the forest floor, Solenopsis invicta, or the red imported fire ants, can come in contact with the big-scaled dwarf gecko. As such, the lizard has several defense mechanisms to protect themselves.

It was noted that when the big-scaled dwarf gecko was not near any fire ants, it displayed little to no body twitching and would remain relatively immobile. Stance changing was also common in this situation as to scout out threats.

However, in the presence of the fire ants, the lizard would begin twitching and flee from the area. In the case that contact was unavoidable, the big-scaled dwarf gecko would use an array of weaponized body movements such as limb and tail flicks. These flicks are able to deflect incoming fire ants. Occasionally, in high density fire ant regions, the lizard would eat ants to prevent them from remounting an attack. This behavior is anti-predatory and does not exist as a method of nutrition. In most fire ant encounters, the big-scaled dwarf gecko would seek to avoid contact and would not chase the fire ants.

== Physiology ==
=== Thermoregulation ===
Because the big-scaled dwarf gecko is very small, it is not uncommon that they overheat and experience drying out. As such, they need to be careful in their thermoregulation so that they exist in an optimal environment for activity.

The big-scaled dwarf gecko's ideal temperature varies slightly between males and females in which females preferring a hotter temperature at about 26˚C and males, 25˚C. To achieve these temperatures, they seek cooler microhabitats such as leaf litter. During the late night and early morning, the big-scaled dwarf geckos can experience its preferred temperature in all microhabitats. However, optimal conditions are not always possible during the hotter parts of the afternoon and these lizards are often out of their favored range throughout this time. As predicted, the big-scaled dwarf gecko is not commonly spotted out of leaf litter in these hours.

Because of the preference for a cooler environment, big-scaled dwarf geckos can be found changing locations throughout the day, preferring shaded areas during the hotter hours. When leaf litter was not a possible habitat, these lizards were found in dense grass.

Furthermore, between adults and juveniles, there exists a disagreement between microhabitat preferences. Adults prefer dense grass and juveniles will choose grass or sand areas. While dense grass is cooler, the grass and sand areas are higher in humidity.

=== Evaporative water loss ===
As mentioned in the thermoregulation section, the big-scaled dwarf gecko easily experiences desiccation due to its small size. In its preferred temperatures of 26˚C and 25˚C for females and males respectively, the rate of total evaporative water loss was about 4.2 ± 0.58 mg. Above these temperatures, starting from 27˚C, total evaporative water loss began to increase proportionally with the temperature. At 30˚C, the total evaporative water loss measured at 5.4 ± 0.31 mg. Accordingly, the breathing rate of the big-scaled dwarf gecko also increased with the temperature. From 21˚C to 27˚C, the lizards' breathing rates shoot up from 23.7 cycles per minute to 38.5 cycles per minute. This parallels the rise in total evaporative water loss.

Additionally, compared to its close relative of Sphaerodactylus beattyi, the Sphaerodactylus macrolepis actually experiences more evaporative water loss, specifically 37% more. This is likely because of the different habitats the two occupy and minor physiological differences. However, the respiratory water loss along with the breathing rate is actually quite similar between the two species. The main reason for the discrepancy in evaporative water losses is the increased amount of cutaneous water loss in the Sphaerodactylus macrolepis. This increased rate of water loss is most likely due to the different habitats that the two lizards reside in and goes to show how living environment can affect the level of evaporative water loss.

=== Visual acuity ===
Depending on a lizard's habitat, their motion detection ability differs between light levels. For the Sphaerodactylus macrolepis, its two primary habitats are rain forests and in vegetation near beaches. The two places differ in light levels, with the forest leaf litter being a dark habitat with not much light, and the beach being a brighter, more open area. As such, S. macrolepis from the two areas show separate levels of motion detection ability at different light ranges. For lizards from the beach, its motion detection best functions at light levels of 200-300 lux. This is much higher than lizards from the forest who better see in lower light levels of 10 lux. These ranges do not change between sexes, with both male and female S. macrolepis displaying optimal visual and motion acuity at the same light levels only differing depending on habitat. This lizard engages in behavior described by the sensory drive hypothesis that allows for the Sphaerodactylus macrolepis to engage in signals that have evolved to match the sensory abilities of receivers.

== Conservation ==
Currently, the Sphaerodactylus macrolepis is classified as least concern by the IUCN. This classification was completed in 2015 in which the big-scaled dwarf gecko was found in stable population. They are common throughout the area around Puerto Rico and face no major threats to their existence.
