= Richard D. Alexander =

American zoologist

- Born: November 18, 1929; White Heath, Illinois
- Died: August 20, 2018 (aged 88)
- Education: Blackburn College (Carlinville, Illinois), Ohio State University (Ph.D. 1956)
- Known for: Model for a eusocial vertebrate
- Scientific career
- Fields: Systematics, evolution
- Workplaces: University of Michigan
- Notable students: Bret Weinstein, Mary Jane West-Eberhard

Richard Dale Alexander (November 18, 1929 – August 20, 2018) was an American zoologist who was a professor at the University of Michigan and curator at the university's museum of zoology of in Ann Arbor, Michigan. His scientific pursuits integrated the fields of systematics, ecology, evolution, natural history and behavior. The salient organisms in his research are wide-ranging, from the orthopterans (grasshoppers, katydids and crickets) and Cicadidae (cicadas) to vertebrates: dogs, horses, and primates, including humans.

== Biography ==
Alexander obtained an associate of arts degree from Blackburn College (Carlinville, Illinois) in 1948, a Bachelor of Science in education (biology) and a PhD from Ohio State University in 1956. He joined the University of Michigan faculty in 1957. He was the Donald Ward Tinkle Professor of Evolutionary Biology from 1984 to 1989 and was named the Theodore H. Hubbell Distinguished University Professor of Evolutionary Biology in 1989. He served as director of the Museum of Zoology from 1993 to 1998. For over 40 years, Alexander taught two graduate courses in alternate fall semesters: evolutionary ecology and evolution and behavior; during these semesters he dedicated all his time to prepare his lecture materials — fresh and up-to-date every year — which included many a time novel, provocative ideas from his own students and university colleagues; among which Prof. Donald W. Tinkle, curator of herpetology at the UMMZ and evolutionary biologist, was very prominent until his death in 1980. His course lectures were perhaps the most popular in the schools of natural sciences and natural resources at the university and were often attended by other faculty members and visiting students including many from the social sciences (anthropology, geography, sociology, psychology).

In 1974 he created a detailed model for a eusocial vertebrate, having no idea that a mammal with these characteristics actually existed. It turned out that his hypothetical eusocial rodent was a "perfect description" of the naked mole-rat (Heterocephalus glaber).

== Publications ==
Alexander's publications related to the evolution of behaviour and its bearing on human nature. After his retirement in 2000, he devoted most of his time to his horse farm, where he bred, reined, trained and rode them.

=== On humans ===
==== Books ====
- Darwinism and Human Affairs. Seattle: U. Washington Press. ISBN 0-295-95641-0, 1979.
- The Biology of Moral Systems. New York: Aldine De Gruyter. ISBN 0-202-01174-7, 1987
- Natural Selection and Social Behavior. Recent Research and New Theory. New York: Chiron Press. with D. W. Tinkle (eds.). 1981

==== Articles ====
- The search for an evolutionary philosophy of man. Proceedings of the Royal Society of Victoria, Melbourne 84: 99–120. 1971
- The evolution of social behaviour. Annual Review of Ecology and Systematics. 5:325-383. 1974
- Group selection, altruism, and the levels of organization of life. Annual Review of Ecology and Systematics 9: 449–474. With G. Borgia. 1978
- Epigenetic rules and Darwinian algorithms: The adaptive study of learning and development. Ethology and Sociobiology 11:241-303. 1990
- How Did Humans Evolve? Reflections on the Uniquely Unique Species. University of Michigan Museum of Zoology Special Publication 1:1-38. 1990
- Biological considerations in the analysis of morality. In: M. H. and D. V. Nitecki (eds.). Evolutionary Ethics. State University of New York Press, pp. 162–196. 1993

==== Video ====
- Dick Alexander speaking at Dan Otte symposium

=== On horses ===
- Teaching Yourself to Train Your Horse. Woodlane Farm Books. ISBN 0-9712314-0-0, 2001

=== On Insects ===
- Aggressiveness, territoriality, and sexual behavior in field crickets (Orthoptera - Gryllidae), Behaviour (17) pp. 130–223. 1961

=== Children's reading ===
- The Red Fox and Johnny Valentine's Blue-Speckled Hound. Woodlane Farm Books. ISBN 0-9712314-2-7, 2004
- Thumping on Trees. Woodlane Farm Books. ISBN 978-0-9712314-4-3

== Honors and awards ==
- Newcomb Cleveland Prize from the American Association for the Advancement of Science (1961)
- Daniel Giraud Elliot Medal from the National Academy of Sciences (1971)
- Elected to the National Academy of Sciences (1974)
- Amoco Foundation Good Teaching Award (1977)
- Distinguished Faculty Achievement Award from The University of Michigan (1981)
- Russell Lectureship (1988)
- The University of Michigan LSA Senior Distinguished Lecturer (1994)
- Distinguished Animal Behaviorist, awarded by the Animal Behavior Society (2003)
