= Ken Richardson (psychologist) =

British psychologist and author (born 1942)

Kenneth Richardson (born 21 July 1942) is a British psychologist, author, and former lecturer at the Open University, where he began working in 1971. He has written several books highly critical of IQ testing and related concepts in the field of psychometrics, such as Spearman's g. He contends that the definitions of intelligence, and the assumptions of its causes, "lie at the core of political ideologies", and has called for IQ tests to be banned. He has supported this position by arguing that IQ tests do not measure cognitive ability, but rather conformity with the culture of the tests' designers. Richardson debated the measurement of intelligence with philosopher of science Michael Ruse on the BBC's In Our Time.

Richardson's son, Brian Richardson, is a senior manager in the Science Web and Interactive Media Team at the Open University.

== Bibliography ==
- Race, Culture and Intelligence (Penguin, 1972) (co-editor)
- Race, Education, Intelligence (National Union of Teachers, 1978) (pamphlet, co-authored with Steven Rose and the National Union of Teachers)
- Understanding Psychology (Open University, 1988)
- Understanding Intelligence (Open University, 1991)
- Models of Cognitive Development (Psychology Press, 1998)
- The Origins Of Human Potential (Routledge, 1998)
- The Making of Intelligence (Weidenfeld & Nicolson, 1999; Columbia University Press, 2000)
- The Evolution of Intelligent Systems: How Molecules Became Minds (Palgrave MacMillan, 2010)
- Genes, Brains, and Human Potential: The Science and Ideology of Intelligence (Columbia University Press, 2017)
- Understanding Intelligence (Cambridge University Press, 2022)
