= SRGAP2 =

Protein-coding gene in humans

Identifiers
- Aliases: SRGAP2, ARHGAP34, FNBP2, SRGAP2A, SRGAP3, SLIT-ROBO Rho GTPase activating protein 2
- External IDs: OMIM: 606524; MGI: 109605; GeneCards: SRGAP2
Available structures
PDB	Ortholog search: PDBe RCSB
PDB	List of PDB id codes 4RTT, 4RUG, 2DL8

Gene location (Human)
Chr.	Chromosome 1 (human)
Band	1q32.1	Start	206,203,346 bp
Band	1q32.1	End	206,464,436 bp

Gene location (Mouse)
Chr.	Chromosome 1 (mouse)
Band	1|1 E4	Start	131,212,989 bp
Band	1|1 E4	End	131,455,090 bp
RNA expression pattern
Bgee	Human / Mouse (ortholog); Top expressed in: cerebellar hemisphere; right hemisphere of cerebellum; sural nerve; paraflocculus of cerebellum; ventricular zone; skin of leg; ganglionic eminence; skin of abdomen; C1 segment; monocyte / Top expressed in: lumbar subsegment of spinal cord; cerebellar cortex; tail of embryo; lobe of cerebellum; cerebellar vermis; stroma of bone marrow; Rostral migratory stream; superior frontal gyrus; dentate gyrus of hippocampal formation granule cell; lip; More reference expression data
BioGPS	n/a
Gene ontology
Molecular function	protein homodimerization activity; protein binding; GTPase activator activity; identical protein binding
Cellular component	cytoplasm; cytosol; postsynaptic membrane; cell projection; membrane; postsynaptic density; dendritic spine; synapse; cell junction; dendritic spine head; phagocytic vesicle; cytoplasmic vesicle; nucleus; lamellipodium; plasma membrane; nucleoplasm
Biological process	lamellipodium assembly involved in ameboidal cell migration; negative regulation of neuron migration; neuron projection morphogenesis; actin filament severing; filopodium assembly; negative regulation of cell death; nervous system development; dendritic spine development; substrate adhesion-dependent cell spreading; extension of a leading process involved in cell motility in cerebral cortex radial glia guided migration; cell population proliferation; regulation of small GTPase mediated signal transduction; signal transduction; positive regulation of GTPase activity; negative regulation of cell migration
Sources:Amigo / QuickGO
Orthologs
Databases	NCBI: entry; OMA: entry
Species	Human	Mouse
Entrez	23380	14270
Ensembl	ENSG00000266028	ENSMUSG00000026425
UniProt	O75044	Q91Z67
RefSeq (mRNA)	NM_001042758; NM_001170637; NM_001300952; NM_015326; NM_001377444 NM_001377445; NM_001377446; NM_001377447	NM_001081011; NM_019520
RefSeq (protein)	NP_001164108; NP_001287881; NP_056141; NP_001364373; NP_001364374 NP_001364375; NP_001364376	NP_001074480
Location (UCSC)	Chr 1: 206.2 – 206.46 Mb	Chr 1: 131.21 – 131.46 Mb
PubMed search
- Wikidata
View/Edit Human	View/Edit Mouse

SLIT-ROBO Rho GTPase-activating protein 2 (srGAP2), also known as formin-binding protein 2 (FNBP2), is a mammalian protein that in humans is encoded by the SRGAP2 gene. It is involved in neuronal migration and differentiation and plays a critical role in synaptic development, brain mass and number of cortical neurons. Downregulation of srGAP2 inhibits cell–cell repulsion and enhances cell–cell contact duration.

SRGAP2 dimerizes through its F-BAR domain. SRGAP2C, a shortened version found in early hominins and humans that only has the F-BAR domain, antagonizes its action. It slows maturation of some neurons and increases neuronal spine density. SRGAP2 may also be involved in the development of some cancers.

== Evolution ==
SRGAP2 is one of 23 genes that are known to be duplicated in humans but not other primates as a segmental duplication. SRGAP2 has been duplicated three times in the human genome in the past 3.4 million years: one duplication 3.4 million years ago (mya) called SRGAP2B, followed by two that copied SRGAP2B 2.4 mya into SRGAP2C and ~1 mya into SRGAP2D. All three duplications are also present in Denisovans and Neanderthals. They are shortened in the same manner, keeping the F-box domain but losing the RhoGAP and SH3 domains. All humans possess SRGAP2C. SRGAP2C inhibits the function of the ancestral copy, SRGAP2A, by heterodimerization and allows faster migration of neurons by interfering with filopodia production as well as slowing the rate of synaptic maturation and increasing the density of synapses in the cerebral cortex. SRGAP2B is expressed at very low levels, and SRGAP2D is a pseudogene. Not all humans have SRGAP2B or SRGAP2D.
