= Sphaerodactylus beattyi =

Conservation status
- Endangered (IUCN 3.1)

Scientific classification
- Kingdom: Animalia
- Phylum: Chordata
- Class: Reptilia
- Order: Squamata
- Suborder: Gekkota
- Family: Sphaerodactylidae
- Genus: Sphaerodactylus
- Species: S. beattyi

Binomial name
- Sphaerodactylus beattyi Grant, 1937

Species of lizard

Sphaerodactylus beattyi, also known commonly as the Saint Croix's sphaero, Beatty's least gecko, and the cotton ginner gecko, is a species of lizard in the family Sphaerodactylidae. The species is endemic to Saint Croix in the United States Virgin Islands. There are two recognized subspecies.

== Taxonomy ==
The specific name, beattyi, is in honor of Crucian naturalist Harry Andrew Beatty (1902–1989). The subspecies seamani is named in honor of Crucian George A. Seaman.

Two subspecies are recognized as being valid, including the nominotypical subspecies.

- Sphaerodactylus beattyi beattyi Grant, 1937
- Sphaerodactylus beattyi seamani Thomas & Schwartz, 1966

== Ecology ==
The preferred habitats of S. beattyi are shrubland and forest at altitudes of 0–150 m (0–492 ft).

S. beattyi is oviparous.
