= SRGAP2C =

Protein-coding gene in humans

Identifiers
- Aliases: SRGAP2C, SRGAP2P1, SLIT-ROBO Rho GTPase activating protein 2C
- External IDs: OMIM: 614704; GeneCards: SRGAP2C

Gene location (Human)
Chr.	Chromosome 1 (human)
Band	1p11.2	Start	121,184,811 bp
Band	1p11.2	End	121,392,874 bp
RNA expression pattern
Bgee	Human / Mouse (ortholog); Top expressed in: ventricular zone; cerebellum; cerebellar cortex; corpus callosum; cerebellar hemisphere; right hemisphere of cerebellum; C1 segment; ganglionic eminence; tibial nerve; skin of leg / n/a; More reference expression data
BioGPS	n/a
Gene ontology
Molecular function	protein homodimerization activity; GTPase activator activity; protein heterodimerization activity
Cellular component	cytoplasm
Biological process	extension of a leading process involved in cell motility in cerebral cortex radial glia guided migration; negative regulation of cell migration; negative regulation of dendritic spine development; nervous system development; negative regulation of filopodium assembly; positive regulation of neuron migration; positive regulation of GTPase activity
Sources:Amigo / QuickGO
Orthologs
Databases	NCBI: entry; OMA: entry
Species	Human	Mouse
Entrez	653464	n/a
Ensembl	ENSG00000171943	n/a
UniProt	P0DJJ0	n/a
RefSeq (mRNA)	NM_001271872; NM_001329984	n/a
RefSeq (protein)	NP_001258801; NP_001316913	n/a
Location (UCSC)	Chr 1: 121.18 – 121.39 Mb	n/a
PubMed search		n/a
- Wikidata
View/Edit Human

SLIT-ROBO Rho GTPase activating protein 2C is a protein in humans that is encoded by the SRGAP2C gene.

== Evolution ==
Cortical development gene Slit-Robo Rho GTPase-activating protein 2 (SRGAP2) has been highly conserved over mammalian evolution, and human is the only lineage wherein gene duplications have occurred (three times). The promoter and first nine exons of SRGAP2 duplicated from 1q23.1 (SRGAP2A) to 1q21.1 (SRGAP2B) ~3.4 million years ago (mya). Two larger duplications later copied SRGAP2B to chromosome 1p12 (SRGAP2C) and to proximal 1q21.1 (SRGAP2D) ~2.4 and ~1 mya, respectively. Ancestral SRGAP2A and the derived SRGAP2C copy are fixed at diploid copy number two. In contrast, the SRGAP2B and SRGAP2D are highly copy number polymorphic, with normal individuals identified that completely lack these paralogscopies. SRGAP2C is the most likely duplicate to encode a functional protein and is among the most fixed human-specific duplicate genes. Incomplete duplication created a novel gene function—antagonizing parental SRGAP2 function immediately “at birth” 2–3 mya, which is a time corresponding to the transition from Australopithecus to Homo and the beginning of neocortex expansion.

== Function ==
SRGAP2C is expressed in the human brain and dimerizes with ancestral SRGAP2 to antagonize it. In the mouse neocortex, SRGAP2 promotes spine maturation and limits spine density. SRGAP2C phenocopies SRGAP2 deficiency and underlies sustained radial migration and results in the emergence of human-specific features, including neoteny during spine maturation and increased density of longer spines. It appears that the SRGAP2C ultimately assumed the antagonistic function of the SRGAP2B duplicate, which shows evidence of pseudogenization in contemporary humans. It is unlikely that SRGAP2B and SRGAP2D are now functional as SRGAP2B has a markedly reduced expression in human brain compared to SRGAP2C and the transcripts produced by SRGAP2D lack two internal exons, leading to a premature termination codon. SRGAP2B and SRGAP2C are necessary in the protracted synaptic maturation of human neurons. They act on ancestral molecular pathways that involve SRGAP2 and SYNGAP1, a major gene involved in neurodevelopmental disorders.
