= Cognitive specialization =

Evolutionary specialization of cognitive abilities for adaptation and survival

Cognitive specialization suggests that certain behaviors, often in the domain of social communication, are passed on to offspring and refined to be maximally beneficial by the process of natural selection. Specializations serve an adaptive purpose for an organism by allowing the organism to be better suited for its habitat. Over time, specializations often become essential to the species' continued survival. Cognitive specialization in humans has been thought to underlie the acquisition, development, and evolution of language, theory of mind, and specific social skills such as trust and reciprocity. These specializations are considered to be critical to the survival of the species, even though there are successful individuals who lack certain specializations, including those diagnosed with autism spectrum disorder or who lack language abilities. Cognitive specialization is also believed to underlie adaptive behaviors such as self-awareness, navigation, and problem solving skills in several animal species such as chimpanzees and bottlenose dolphins.

== Background ==
First studied as an adaptive mechanism specific to humans, cognitive specialization has since evolved to encompass many behaviors in the social realm. Organisms have evolved over millions of years to become well-adapted to their habitats; this requires becoming specialized in behaviors that improve an organism's likelihood of survival and reproduction. Not to be confused with functional specialization, which examines the specific parts of the brain that are engaged during specific behaviors or processes, cognitive specialization is focused on characteristics of the mind (an internal entity), which in turn affects external behaviors. Most of these specializations are thought to have developed in areas of the neocortex unique to humans. The most significant cognitive specializations among humans include theory of mind and language acquisition and production, while non-human animals may specialize in foraging behavior, self-awareness, or other adaptive abilities.

== Social behavior ==
Social communication is critical to effective human interaction, and has evolved over time to support the complex exchange of ideas. Some social behaviors, such as helping and altruism, are largely unique to humans and are instrumental in ensuring the survival of the species. Evolutionary psychologists Leda Cosmides and John Tooby argue that the human mind contains "specialized mechanisms" that were designed by natural selection to facilitate social communication and exchange. Without this specialized "algorithm", Cosmides and Tooby claim, social exchange among humans would be closer to that of our closest evolutionary ancestors, the great apes. In addition to humans' broad abilities supporting positive social interaction, Stone et al. (2002) put forth evidence for more specific specializations including "cheater detection" and "precautionary reasoning," both of which appear to serve strong adaptive purposes by allowing humans to share resources with only those who are likely to share with them in the future, and avoid sharing resources with untrustworthy individuals. Overall, the adaptiveness of social communication has been examined in children, adults, and older adults, across cultures, and in neuropsychiatric populations.

=== Evidence for universality ===
If social behavior is to be considered a cognitive specialization unique to human neural architecture, it should be present in every human society. To provide cross-cultural evidence that cognitive adaptations specifically support social communication, Sugiyama, Tooby, and Cosmides investigated social reasoning in a tribe in the Ecuadorian Amazon. The Shiwiar, who are a hunter-horticulturalist group previously unexposed to the presented psychological stimuli, were "as highly proficient" in determining who cheated in a given situation as their counterparts in the United States. This performance indicates that social communication, at least in the domain of cheater detection, is not determined by one's culture. According to Sugiyama, Tooby, and Cosimdes, the social "algorithms" discussed above are present in both Western and non-Western populations, providing strong evidence for the universality of such a skill.

== Theory of mind ==
Theory of mind, or the ability to attribute mental states to other people, is thought to be a cognitive specialization unique to humans, with a few possible exceptions discussed below. Theory of mind is thought to be critical in social cognition and communication because it allows us to distinguish between accidental and purposeful actions, to make judgments about others' internal states, and to determine how another's thoughts may differ from our own. The acquisition of theory of mind in humans mostly takes place during early childhood, and is thought to be fully developed by the early school years. Theory of mind research in chimpanzees by social psychologists David Premack and Guy Woodruff in 1978 brought it to the forefront of psychological inquiry, though true theory of mind is only thought to exist in humans. This phenomenon has been analyzed in many fields, and it is thought to be among the most beneficial specializations for survival of the human species, due to its facilitation of cooperation and interpersonal relationships.

=== In autism ===
Theory of mind appears to be lacking in children with autism spectrum disorders, and this deficit is thought to be a major contributor to frequent impairments in some areas of social understanding in people with autism. The fact that a developmental delay in (or absence of) theory of mind can impair social functioning—a skill imperative in the survival of the human species—is argued to be evidence for theory of mind as an adaptive cognitive specialization. Understanding that others may be thinking different thoughts than I am (colloquially, "putting oneself in another person's shoes") allows humans to communicate effectively and to live in large social groups. This adaptability is what makes theory of mind a cognitive specialization, rather than just another byproduct of human evolution: humankind has unique and beneficial communication skills, and this is partially due to our ability to recognize that other people may not think or know the same things we do.

== Language ==
Though some (including Bates et al.) have argued that language arose as a byproduct of the evolution of humans' general cognitive abilities, Steven Pinker argues that it is, on its own, an adaptive mechanism. Drawing on existing literature and theory, he proposes several types of evidence for this claim, including the universality and ontogeny of language. Pinker also uses the double dissociation between general intelligence and language to argue for language as a specific adaptation. Those who lose language capabilities due to traumatic brain injury or stroke but maintain many other cognitive abilities exemplify Pinker's idea that language and general cognition are not always perfectly overlapping in human behavior. Using language "multiplies the benefit of knowledge" in multiple domains, including technology, tool use, and intentions of ourselves and others.

=== Evolution ===
Arbib puts forth a hypothesis that mirror neurons in the primate brain were a precursor to language abilities in humans. Without these neurons in Broca's area in humans (which is analogous to F5 in monkeys), Arbib claims, we could not have evolved a specialization for language—which is used to explain why non-human animals do not have linguistic capabilities. In addition, Meguerditchian and Vauclair have argued that our evolutionary ancestors' communicative gestures (such as threat gestures and "food begs" among baboons) established a foundation on which to build human language skills. This behavior was selected for, built upon, and modified, leading to the capabilities humans have today. Early theories explained early language as an adaptive way to communicate during a hunt, but recent research has focused on ecological theories that incorporate social demands; or, as Flinn et al. put it, a "social arms race" against non-human primates. As a behavior selected for over the long term, with many successful "intermediary stages," human language differs from all other social behaviors among chimpanzees, which are thought to be more gradual in their evolutionary development. Further evidence for language as a cognitive specialization includes Ferreira et al.'s finding that some parts of language (for instance, syntax) can be spared in amnesia, while other abilities (like memory retention) are drastically reduced. This and similar dissociations support the theory that specific neural architecture, which has evolved over time, supports language function.

=== Universal Grammar ===
Linguist Noam Chomsky proposed a biological component of language, which he termed Universal Grammar. According to Chomsky, an essential part of language processing is hard-wired into the human brain. This allows language to be produced with or without specific linguistic instruction (which is closely associated with the poverty of the stimulus argument). All humans—and only humans—have this biological trait, but building blocks of universal grammar have been reported in other species. Jackendoff argues that Universal Grammar is itself a "pre-existing cognitive specialization": rather than needing explicit instruction on how to speak their native language, or having vocabulary and syntactical rules of a specific language present in their brains from birth, children seem to be genetically pre-disposed to learn language. Complementary to the connection made between area F5 in macaques' brains, the theory of Universal Grammar allows for an evolutionary perspective on language use as a cognitive specialization. There is some controversy, however, on whether or not Universal Grammar can have evolved by standard Darwinian evolutionary principles, or must be explained using different mechanisms.

=== Benefits ===
According to Nowak and Sigmund, language is essential to human life as we know it. Without the ability to verbally communicate with members of our social group, there would be no reciprocity (that is, returning of favors), and no way to cooperate with one another for a greater good. Some have argued that unique aspects of human language have evolved for unexpectedly beneficial reasons, besides simply asking for help or sharing information about the world. Gossip, viewed by many to be a superfluous aspect of human communication, may even serve an adaptive purpose. The spread of information about other people, even if it is malicious, may serve as an indicator of social intelligence and a way to deter illicit behaviors. Though gossip likely helps some humans and hinders others' social standing, it appears to be an overall benefit of the ability to produce verbal language. Without an overall specialization for language (including such sub-specializations as gossip), linguists argue, humans would not be able to share information efficiently and effectively.

== Other possible specializations ==
Watson et al. provide support for a specific specialization in language-dependent humor. Its adaptive value has both extrinsic and intrinsic components: humor facilitates social bonding if shared extrinsically, and provides pleasure if enjoyed in one's own mind. In addition, Johnson-Frey (2003) proposed a unique human specialization for tool use. According to Johnson-Frey, humans' ability to use tools is based on complex cognitive mechanisms, not just advanced sensorimotor skills. Rather than it being considered a purely physical specialization based only in motor areas of the brain, Johnson-Frey argues that tool use should be classified as a cognitive phenomenon due to its foundation in cognition. On a more philosophical level, Boyer (2003) argues that "religious thought and behavior" is a specialization that originally developed as a by-product of brain function, and its adaptive purposes led to its continued evolution by natural selection. Krueger et al. (2007) have argued that trust, which may form the foundation for helping and altruism and thus the basis of human social interaction, is also a cognitive specialization.

== Non-human specialization ==
=== In non-human primates ===
Humankind's closest ancestors, the great apes, have evolved a number of specialized behaviors: orangutans are specialists at climbing trees, while chimpanzees and gorillas have evolved to walk on their knuckles. However, in considering non-behavioral specializations, Penn et al. (2008) argue that the "profound continuity" Charles Darwin noted between human and non-human animals in the biological domain is matched by a "profound discontinuity" between human and non-human animal minds. In contrast, in addition to cognitive-behavioral adaptations, it is possible that chimpanzees have acquired more socially advanced skills through natural selection, including self-recognition (indicated by chimpanzees' established ability to pass the "mirror test"). This task—in which a successful trial is simply one in which an animal recognizes itself in a mirror—is thought to be a basic building block of theory of mind development. Rhesus monkeys have also been shown to realize when they remember certain events and items, which is considered to be an instrumental building block in the formation of social relationships, as one must remember who owes him favors, who he can trust, and who he should avoid in order to prosper in the community.

=== In other animals ===
More recent evidence has shown that cognitive specialization is not just present in primates: domesticated dogs may show signs of understanding human behavior and communication, indicating a social-cognitive specialization that is argued to make them more likely to receive food, shelter and love from their human owners. Being receptive to human behavioral indicators and responding accordingly has allowed dogs to survive and thrive as a species. Bottlenose dolphins and elephants have also been shown to pass the "mirror test" explained above. This indication of some elementary self-awareness provides more evidence for foundational theory of mind skills in organisms throughout the animal kingdom. Ants, bees, and other insects have also evolved behaviors consistent with various specializations, including advanced navigational skills and several basic social communication abilities. Adaptive cognitive evolution has been examined in pigeons' ability to group objects (which is argued to support their processing of and adaptation to novel environments), problem solving and "creative" tool modification among rooks, and tool use in crows.

== See also ==
- Functional specialization (brain)
- Behavioral neuroscience
- Evolutionary psychology
