= Mary Jane West-Eberhard =

American entomologist (born 1941)

- Born: 1941 (age 84–85)
- Education: University of Michigan
- Title: Vice-chair Committee on Human Rights, National Academy of Sciences USA, National Academy of Medicine, National Academy of Engineers (2010-present)
- Awards: 2003 Sewall Wright Award; 2003 Hawkins Award, American Association of Publishers; 2012 Quest Award for Lifetime Achievement Animal Behavior Society; 2014 Hamilton Award, International Union for the Study of Social Insects
- Scientific career
- Fields: Eusociality; Sexual selection; Phenotypic plasticity
- Workplaces: Smithsonian Tropical Research Institute
- Academic advisors: Richard D. Alexander

Notes
- Member United States National Academy of Sciences; Member American Academy of Arts and Sciences; Foreign member Accademia dei Lincei

Mary Jane West-Eberhard (born 1941) is an American theoretical biologist noted for arguing that phenotypic and developmental plasticity played a key role in shaping animal evolution and speciation. She is also an entomologist notable for her work on the behavior and evolution of social wasps.

She is a member both of the United States National Academy of Sciences and the American Academy of Arts and Sciences. In 2005 she was elected to be a foreign member of the Italian Accademia dei Lincei. She has been a past president (1991) of the Society for the Study of Evolution. She won the 2003 R.R. Hawkins Award for the Outstanding Professional, Reference or Scholarly Work for her book Developmental Plasticity and Evolution (618 pages). In the same year she was the recipient of the Sewall Wright Award. She has been selected as one of the 21 "Leaders in Animal Behavior".

She is engaged in long-term research projects at the Smithsonian Tropical Research Institute at the Escuela de Biologia, Universidad de Costa Rica.

== Early life and education ==
West-Eberhard's mother was a primary school teacher, and her father, a small-town businessman, and as parents they encouraged her curiosity. She went to school in Plymouth Community Schools, Plymouth, Michigan. She recalls of her high school that the best scientific training "was an English course on critical reading and writing, taught by the school librarian. Biology class was just a workbook, an enormous disappointment for me."

She did all her degrees at the University of Michigan. She did her bachelor's degree from University of Michigan in zoology in 1963. She earned her master's degree from the same place in zoology in 1964, and then her PhD (zoology) in 1967. There she was taught by Richard D. Alexander and had part-time employment in its Museum of Zoology. She records that "I also learned the excitement of being a sleuth in the university libraries where even an undergraduate could explore an idea beyond textbooks and could feel like a pioneer". She also corresponded with Edward Wilson on trophic eggs in insects, and spent summers at Woods Hole and Cali in Colombia.

She did postdoctoral work (1967–1969) at Harvard University with Howard Evans. There she met her husband. She then spent the next ten years (1969–1979) as an associate in biology at the University of Valle. In 1973 she began an association with the Smithsonian Tropical Research Institute in Costa Rica which became a full-time employment in 1986.

== Social insects ==
West-Eberhard has studied many species of social wasps such as Polistes fuscatus, Polistes canadensis, and Polistes erythrocephalus. Through her studies she has investigated why wasps evolved from being casteless and nestsharing casteless to becoming highly specialized eusocial species using comparative studies of tropical wasps (Hymenoptera). She has argued that origins of nonreproductive females in social wasps involves mutualism rather than only kin selection or parental manipulation.

Her work upon social insects has played an important role in the development of her ideas upon phenotypic plasticity. As she notes "From there I got interested in alternative phenotypes—alternative pathways and decision points during development, and their significance for evolution, especially for higher levels of organization, for speciation, and for macroevolutionary change without speciation."

== Phenotypic plasticity ==
West-Eberhard has written from the mid-1980s upon the role of "alternative phenotypes," such as polymorphisms, polyphenisms, and context sensitive phenotype life history and physiological traits. This resulted in her 2003 book Developmental Plasticity and Evolution.

She argues that such alternative phenotypes are important since they can lead to novel traits, and then to genetic divergence and so speciation. Through alternative phenotypes environmental induction can take the lead in genetic evolution. Her book Developmental Plasticity and Evolution developed in detail how such environmental plasticity plays a key role in understanding the genetic theory of evolution. Her argument is full of examples from butterflies to elephants.

== Sexual and social selection ==
West-Eberhard was among the first scientists to reexamine Charles Darwin's ideas in The Descent of Man, and Selection in Relation to Sex about sexual selection and identify the key importance he gave to the "social competition for mates" as a factor in evolution and speciation. She has noted how sexual selection can trap animals into sexual dimorphisms, to maintain separate sexes in sexual reproduction.

== Other work ==
As a member of the United States National Academy of Sciences, West-Eberhard has served for three terms on its Committee on Human Rights. She has also been noted as "active in promoting the careers of young scientists, particularly those doing work in Latin America".

Since 2013, West-Eberhard has been listed on the advisory council of the National Center for Science Education.

== Selected bibliography ==
=== Social wasps ===
- 1967. Foundress associations in polistine wasps: dominance hierarchies and the evolution of social behavior. Science 157(3796):1584-1585. PMID 6038176
- 1969. The Social Biology of Polistine Wasps. Misc. Publ. Univ. Mich. Mus. Zool. 140:1-101. OCLC 70050
- 1970. Wasps. (with H. E. Evans). University of Michigan Press, Ann Arbor. ISBN 978-0-7153-6060-6
- 1975. The evolution of social behavior by kin selection. Quart. Rev. Biol. 50(1):1-33. JSTOR 2821184
- 1978. Temporary queens in Metapolybia wasps: Non-reproductive helpers without altruism? Science 200 (4340):441-443. PMID 17757302
- 1987. Flexible strategy and social evolution. In Animal societies: Theories and facts, Y. Ito, J. L. Brown, and J. Kikkawa, eds., Japan Scientific Societies Press, Ltd., Tokyo, pp. 35–51. ISBN 978-4-7622-0514-9
- 1988. (with W. T. Wcislo and W. G. Eberhard). Natural history and behavior of a primitively social wasp Auplopus semialatus, and a parasite, Irenangelus eberhardi (Hymenoptera: Pompilidae). J. Insect Behavior 1(2):247-60.
- 1996. Wasp societies as microcosms for the study of development and evolution., pp. 290–317. In Natural history and evolution of paper wasps. (editors, West-Eberhard, M-J. & S. Turillazzi) Oxford University Press, Oxford. ISBN 978-0-19-854947-5
- 2005. (with T. Giray and M. Giovanetti) Juvenile hormone, reproduction, and worker behavior in the neotropical social wasp Polistes canadensis. Proceedings National Academy of Sciences USA 102(9):3330-3335. PMID 15728373
- 2005. The behavior of the primitively social wasp Montezumia cortesioides Willink (Vespidae, Eumeninae) and the origins of vespid sociality. Ecology Ethology and Evolution 17:51-65. OCLC 99462417
- 2008. Inclusive fitness theory and eusociality. Nature. 471(7339):10.1038/nature09831. doi:10.1038/nature09831.

=== Phenotypical plasticity ===
- 1986. Alternative adaptations, speciation, and phylogeny. Proc Natl Acad Sci U S A. 83(5):1388-1392. PMID 16578790
- 1989. Phenotypic plasticity and the origins of diversity. Annu. Rev. Ecol. Syst. 20:249-278.
- 1998. Evolution in the light of developmental and cell biology, and vice versa. Proceedings National Academy of Sciences USA 95:8417-8419. PMID 9671691
- 2002. Development and selection in adaptive evolution. Trends in Ecology & Evolution 17(2):65. OCLC 180235676
- 2003. Developmental plasticity and evolution. Oxford University Press, New York. ISBN 978-0-19-512235-0
- 2005. Developmental plasticity and the origin of species differences. Proceedings National Academy of Sciences USA 102, Suppl. 1:6543-6549. PMID 15851679
- 2005. Phenotypic accommodation: Adaptive innovation due to developmental plasticity. Journal of Experimental Zoology Part B (Molecular and Developmental Evolution) 304B:610-618. PMID 16161068
- 2007. Dancing with DNA and flirting with the ghost of Lamarck. Biology & Philosophy 22(3):439-451. OCLC 210350930
- 2007. Developmental Plasticity, Evolution and the origins of disease. in Nesse, R. (ed.), Evolution and Medicine: How New Applications Advance Research and Practice, The Biomedical & Life Sciences Collection, Henry Stewart Talks Ltd, London (online at http://www.hstalks.com/bio)
- 2007. Are genes good markers of biological traits ? 175–193. In Biological Surveys. National Research Council Committee on Advances in Collecting and Utilizing Biological Indicators and Genetic Information in Social Science Surveys. Weinstein, M., Vaupel, J. W. and Wachter, K.W. (editors), National Academies Press, Washington.
- 2008. Toward a Modern Revival of Darwin's Theory of Evolutionary Novelty. Philosophy of Science, 75:899-908. doi:10.1086/594533

=== Sexual selection ===
- 1979. Sexual selection, social competition, and evolution. Proc. Amer. Phil. Soc. 51(4):222-234.
- 1983. Sexual selection, social competition, and speciation. Quart. Rev. Biol. 58(2):155-183.
- 2005. The maintenance of sex as a developmental trap due to sexual selection. Quarterly Review of Biology 80(1):47-53. PMID 15884735
- 2014. Darwin's forgotten idea: The social essence of sexual selection Neuroscience & Biobehavioral Reviews. Volume 46, Part 4, October 2014, Pages 501-508

=== Other ===
- 2005. Howard E. Evans 1919-2002. Biographical Memoirs, Volume 86. National Academies Press, Washington, D.C., pp. 1–19.
- 2005. (with P.C. Agre, S. Altman, F.R. Curl and T.N. Wiesel). Using ethics to fight bioterrorism. Science 309:1013-1014. PMID 16106523

== Honors and awards ==
- 1963. Phi Beta Kappa (University of Michigan)
- 1963. Phi Beta Kappa (University of Michigan)
- 1963. Woodrow Wilson Fellow (Hon.)
- 1965-66. Rackham Fellow, University of Michigan
- 1966. Edward C. Walker Scholar, University of Michigan
- 1968-69. Milton Fellow, Harvard University
- 1968. Summer Research Fellow, E.N. Huyck Preserve
- 1982. Distinguished Visiting Scientist, University of Michigan Museum of Zoology
- 1987. Elected Vice President, Society for the Study of Evolution
- 1988. Elected Member National Academy of Sciences, U.S.A.
- 1992. Elected President, Society for the Study of Evolution
- 1996. Elected Member American Academy of Arts and Sciences
- 2002. Elected Foreign Member National Academy of Sciences of Costa Rica
- 2003. Sewell Wright Award, American Society of Naturalists
- 2003. Hawkins Award, American Association of Publishers (best scholarly book of 2003 (Developmental Plasticity and Evolution))
- 2004. Hamilton Lecturer, International Society of Behavioral Ecology, Jyvaskyla Finland
- 2005. Elected Foreign Member, Accademia Nazionale dei Lincei, Rome
- 2009. Elected Fellow, Animal Behavior Society
- 2010–present. Vice-chair, Committee on Human Rights, National Academy of Sciences USA, National Academy of Medicine, National Academy of Engineers
- 2012. Quest Award for Lifetime Achievement, Animal Behavior Society
- 2014. Hamilton Award, International Union for the Study of Social Insects
