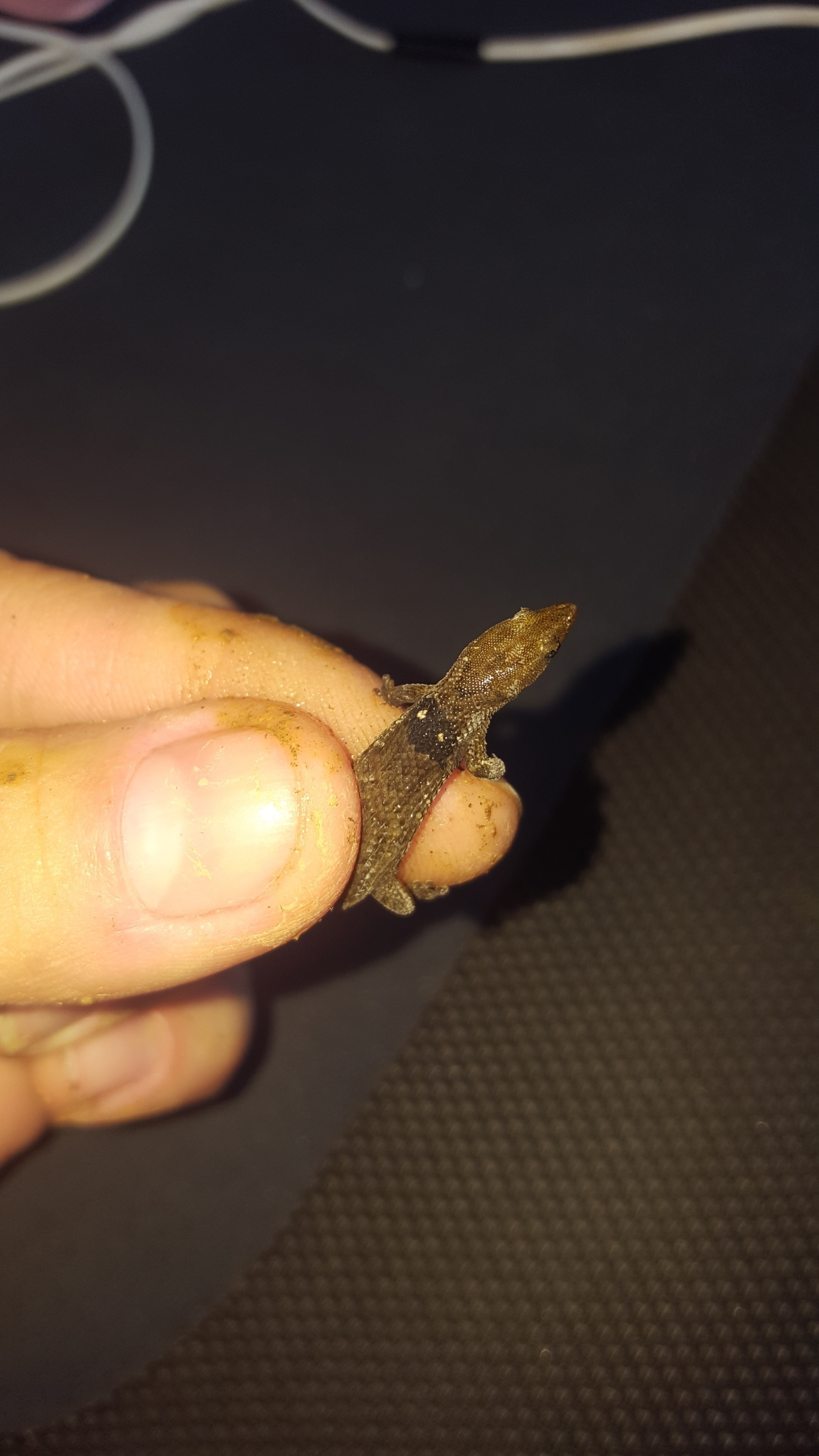

Scientific classification
- Domain: Eukaryota
- Kingdom: Animalia
- Phylum: Chordata
- Class: Reptilia
- Order: Squamata
- Infraorder: Gekkota
- Family: Sphaerodactylidae
- Genus: Sphaerodactylus
- Species: S. grandisquamis

Binomial name
- Sphaerodactylus grandisquamis Stejneger, 1904

Subspecies
- S. g. ateles - Thomas & Schwartz, 1966; S. g. grandisquamis - Stejneger, 1904; S. g. guarionex - Thomas & Schwartz, 1966; S. g. mimetes - Thomas & Schwartz, 1966; S. g. phoberus (see text) - Thomas & Schwartz, 1966; S. g. spanius - Thomas & Schwartz, 1966; S. g. stibarus - Thomas & Schwartz 1966

= Sphaerodactylus grandisquamis =

Species of lizard

The big-scaled dwarf gecko, big-scaled least gecko, or cotton ginner (Sphaerodactylus grandisquamis) is a species of lizard in the family Sphaerodactylidae. It is endemic to Puerto Rico. Sphaerodactylus grandisquamis was formerly a subspecies of Sphaerodactylus macrolepis but was elevated to full species status using a combination of molecular and morphological data. Sphaerodactylus g. phoberus is no longer considered valid and was synonymized with S. g. grandiquamis.
