= List of evolutionary psychologists =

The following is a list of evolutionary psychologists or prominent contributors to the field of evolutionary psychology.

== A ==
- Richard D. Alexander

== B ==
- Jerome Barkow
- Justin L. Barrett
- Paul Bloom
- Pascal Boyer
- David F. Bjorklund
- David Buller
- David Buss

== C ==
- Anne Campbell
- Leda Cosmides

== D ==
- Martin Daly
- Charles Darwin
- Robin Dunbar

== E ==
- Irenäus Eibl-Eibesfeldt

== F ==
- Daniel Fessler
- W. Tecumseh Fitch
- Diana Fleischman

== G ==
- David C. Geary

== H ==
- Jonathan Haidt
- William D. Hamilton
- Judith Rich Harris
- Nicholas Humphrey
- Sarah Blaffer Hrdy

== J ==
- Benedict Jones
- Victor Johnston

== K ==
- Satoshi Kanazawa
- Douglas T. Kenrick
- Robert Kurzban

== L ==
- Elisabeth Lloyd

== M ==
- Richard Machalek
- Francis T. McAndrew
- Geoffrey Miller
- Desmond Morris

== N ==
- Randolph M. Nesse
- Steven Neuberg
- Daniel Nettle

== P ==
- Steven Pinker
- Paul Bloom
- Pascal Boyer

== R ==
- Matt Ridley

== S ==
- Gad Saad
- Mark Schaller
- David P. Schmitt
- Nancy Segal
- Todd K. Shackelford
- John Skoyles
- Dan Sperber
- Donald Symons

== T ==
- John Tooby
- Robert Trivers

== V ==
- Mark van Vugt

== W ==
- George C. Williams
- David Sloan Wilson
- Glenn Wilson
- Margo Wilson
- Lance Workman
- Robert Wright
