= History of evolutionary psychology =

The history of evolutionary psychology began with Charles Darwin, who argued that all the most human of human capacities—the human intellect, rationality, human sexual behaviour, emotional expressions, moral behaviour, language, culture, and conscience—had evolutionary foundations, highlighting in particular those which had originated due to the unusual ways natural selection operates in social animals, that is, by different kinds of group selection, including kin selection and reciprocal altruism. Darwin's work inspired many later psychologists such as Wilhelm Wundt, James Mark Baldwin, William James, Sigmund Freud, George Herbert Mead, Konrad Lorenz and Niko Tinbergen but, in the early 1900s, American psychologists widely rejected Darwin's style of naturalistic observation in favour of laboratory experimentation. Henceforth, 20th century psychologists focused more on behaviorism and proximate explanations for human behavior.

Then, in 1975, E. O. Wilson's landmark book, Sociobiology, synthesized recent theoretical advances in evolutionary theory to explain social behavior in animals, including humans. Jerome Barkow, Leda Cosmides and John Tooby popularized the term "evolutionary psychology" in their 1992 book The Adapted Mind: Evolutionary Psychology and The Generation of Culture. Like sociobiology before it, evolutionary psychology has been embroiled in controversy, but evolutionary psychologists see their field as gaining increased acceptance overall.

== 19th century ==
After his seminal work in developing theories of natural selection, Charles Darwin devoted much of his final years to studying the evolutionary foundations of what he regarded as the most distinctive human qualities, including aesthetic sensibility, morality, language, intellect, and culture. He wrote two books:The Descent of Man, and Selection in Relation to Sex in 1871 and The Expression of the Emotions in Man and Animals in 1872, which addressed topics in evolutionary psychology. He also published pathbreaking evolutionary monographs on insect and invertebrate behaviour, and—believing that infant behaviour gives us privileged access to humans' evolutionary endowment—a seminal case-study of his baby son William's behaviour, containing many observations confirmed by recent research, including those on: infant-adult communication and meta-communication; infant emotional expressions; early reasoning; the experimental study of infant jealousy; and the origins of self-knowledge.

Darwin introduced the concept of sexual selection to explain the presence of animal and human characteristics that seemed unrelated to survival, such as humans' lack of body hair and the peacock's tail. He argued in terms of parental investment to explain contrasting male and female roles surrounding reproduction. He introduced theories concerning group selection, reciprocal altruism, and kin selection to explain self-sacrifice. Darwin pondered why humans and animals were often generous to their group members. Darwin felt that acts of generosity decreased the fitness of generous individuals. This fact contradicts natural selection, which favored the fittest individual. Darwin concluded that while generosity decreased individual fitness, it would increase group fitness. In this case, altruism arose due to competition between groups. The following quote, from Darwin's Origin of Species, is often interpreted by evolutionary psychologists as an indication of his foreshadowing the emergence of the field:

In the distant future I see open fields for far more important researches. Psychology will be based on a new foundation, that of the necessary acquirement of each mental power and capacity by gradation.

— Charles Darwin

== 20th century ==
Darwin's theory inspired William James's functionalist approach to psychology. At the core of his theory was a system of "instincts." James wrote that humans had many instincts, even more than other animals. These instincts, he said, could be overridden by experience and by each other, as many of the instincts were actually in conflict with each other.

In their Evolutionary Psychology Primer, Tooby and Cosmides make note of James' perspective, and also quote him:

"We do not realize that 'normal' behavior needs to be explained at all. This 'instinct blindness' makes the study of psychology difficult. To get past this problem, James suggested that we try to make the 'natural seem strange':"

It takes...a mind debauched by learning to carry the process of making the natural seem strange, so far as to ask for the why of any instinctive human act. To the metaphysician alone can such questions occur as: Why do we smile, when pleased, and not scowl? Why are we unable to talk to a crowd as we talk to a single friend? Why does a particular maiden turn our wits so upside-down? The common man can only say, Of course we smile, of course our heart palpitates at the sight of the crowd, of course we love the maiden, that beautiful soul clad in that perfect form, so palpably and flagrantly made for all eternity to be loved!

And so, probably, does each animal feel about the particular things it tends to do in the presence of particular objects. ... To the lion it is the lioness which is made to be loved; to the bear, the she-bear. To the broody hen, the notion would probably seem monstrous that there should be a creature in the world to whom a nestful of eggs was not the utterly fascinating and precious and never-to-be-too-much-sat-upon object which it is to her.

Thus we may be sure that, however mysterious some animals' instincts may appear to us, our instincts will appear no less mysterious to them. (William James, 1890)

In our view, William James was right about evolutionary psychology. Making the natural seem strange is unnatural -- it requires the twisted outlook seen, for example, in Gary Larson cartoons. Yet it is a pivotal part of the enterprise. Many psychologists avoid the study of natural competences, thinking that there is nothing there to be explained."

According to Noam Chomsky, perhaps Anarchist thinker Peter Kropotkin could be credited as having founded evolutionary psychology, when in his 1902 book Mutual Aid: A Factor of Evolution he argued that the human instinct for cooperation and mutual aid could be seen as stemming from evolutionary adaptation.

William McDougall made a reference to "evolutionary psychology" in his 1919 book An Introduction to Social Psychology: "It is only a comparative and evolutionary psychology that can provide the needed basis (for psychology); and this could not be created before the work of Darwin had convinced men of the continuity of human with animal evolution as regards all bodily characters, and had prepared the way for the quickly following recognition of the similar continuity of man's mental evolution with that of the animal world." (p. 16)

== Post world war II ==
While Darwin's theories on natural selection gained acceptance in the early 20th century, his theories on evolutionary psychology were largely ignored. Only after Second World War, in the 1950s, did interest in the systematic study of animal behavior increase. It was during this period that the modern field of ethology emerged. Konrad Lorenz and Nikolaas Tinbergen were pioneers in developing the theoretical framework of ethology, for which they received the Nobel prize in 1973.

Desmond Morris's book The Naked Ape sought to frame human behavior in evolutionary terms, but his explanations failed to convince academics because they were grounded in a teleological (goal-oriented) understanding of evolution. For example, he said that the pair bond evolved so that men who were out hunting could trust that their mates back home were not having sex with other males.

== Sociobiology ==
In 1975, E. O. Wilson built upon the works of Lorenz and Tinbergen by combining studies of animal behavior, social behavior, and evolutionary theory in his book Sociobiology:The New Synthesis. Wilson included a chapter on human behavior. Wilson's application of evolutionary analysis to human behavior caused bitter debate.

With the publication of Sociobiology, evolutionary thinking for the first time had a recognizable presence in psychology. E. O. Wilson argues that the field of evolutionary psychology is essentially the same as "human sociobiology".

Edward H. Hagen writes in The Handbook of Evolutionary Psychology that sociobiology is, despite public controversy regarding the applications to humans, "one of the scientific triumphs of the twentieth century." "Sociobiology is now part of the core research and curriculum of virtually all biology departments, and it is a foundation of the work of almost all field biologists" Sociobiological research on nonhuman organisms has increased dramatically and appears continuously in the world's top scientific journals such as Nature and Science.The more general term behavioral ecology is commonly used as a substitute for sociobiology in order to avoid public controversy.

== Modern use of the term "evolutionary psychology" ==
The term evolutionary psychology was used by American biologist Michael Ghiselin in a 1973 article published in the journal Science. Jerome Barkow, Leda Cosmides and John Tooby popularized the term "evolutionary psychology" in their 1992 book The Adapted Mind: Evolutionary Psychology and The Generation of Culture. The term is sometimes abbreviated "EvoPsych" or "evo-psych" or similar.

In contrast to sociobiology and behavioral ecology, evolutionary psychology emphasizes that organisms are "adaptation executors" rather than "fitness maximizers." In other words, organisms have emotional, motivational, and cognitive adaptations that generally increased inclusive fitness in the past but may not do so in the present. This distinction may explain some maladaptive behaviors that are the result of "fitness lags" between ancestral and modern environments. For example, our ancestrally developed desires for fat, sugar, and salt often lead to health problems in modern environments where these are readily available in large quantities.

Also, in contrast to sociobiology and behavioral ecology (which mostly study non-human animal behavior), rather than focus primarily on overt behavior, EP attempts to identify underlying psychological adaptations (including emotional, motivational, and cognitive mechanisms), and how these mechanisms interact with the developmental and current environmental influences to produce behavior.

Before 1990, introductory psychology textbooks scarcely mentioned Darwin. In the 1990s, evolutionary psychology was treated as a fringe theory, and evolutionary psychologists depicted themselves as an embattled minority. Coverage in psychology textbooks was largely hostile. According to evolutionary psychologists, current coverage in psychology textbooks is usually neutral or balanced.

The presence of evolutionary theory in psychology has been steadily increasing. According to its proponents, evolutionary psychology now occupies a central place in psychological science.

== See also ==
- Behavioural genetics – Study of genetic-environment interactions influencing behaviour
- Biocultural evolution – Theory of human behavior
- Criticism of evolutionary psychology – Controversy in psychology
- Dual inheritance theory – Theory of human behavior
- Evolutionary economics – Subject inspired by evolutionary biology
- Evolutionary developmental psychology – Psychology field concerned with Darwinian evolution
- Evolutionary educational psychology – Field of study
- Evolutionary neuroscience – Study of the evolution of nervous systems
- Evolutionary psychology research groups and centers
- Gene-centered view of evolution – Theory of the "selfish gene"
- Human behavioral ecology – Study of human behavior and cultural diversity
- List of evolutionary psychologists
- Memetics – Study of self-replicating units of culture
- Multiple discovery – Hypothesis about scientific discoveries and inventions
- Universal Darwinism – Application of Darwinian theory to other fields
- Darwinian literary studies – Branch of literary criticism

== Sources ==
Darwin, Charles (1872). The Origin of Species by Means of Natural Sslection, or the Preservation of Favoured Races in the Struggle for Life (Sixth Edition, with additions and corrections ed.). London: William Cloowes and sons, Stamford Street, and Charing Cross. p. 230.

- Darwin, Charles (1882). The Descent of Man and Selection in Relation to Sex. London: John Murray.
- Shermer (2004). The Science of Good and Evil. Henry Holt and Co. ISBN 978-0-8050-7769-8.
- Wilson, E. O. (2000). Sociobiology. Belknap Press of Harvard University Press. ISBN 978-0-674-00235-7. "Human sociobiology, now often called evolutionary psychology, has in the last quarter of a century emerged as its own field of study, drawing on theory and data from both biology and the social sciences."
- Tooby, John; Barkow, Jerome H.; Cosmides, Leda (1995). The Adapted mind: evolutionary psychology and the generation of culture. Oxford [Oxfordshire]: Oxford University Press. ISBN 0-19-510107-3.
- Wright, Robert (August 29, 1995). The Moral Animal: Why We Are, the Way We Are: The New Science of Evolutionary Psychology. Knopf Doubleday Publishing Group. ISBN 978-0-679-76399-4.
