= Adapting Minds =

2005 book by David Buller

Adapting Minds: Evolutionary Psychology and the Persistent Quest for Human Nature
- Author: David J. Buller
- Publisher: MIT Press
- Publication date: 2005
- ISBN: 9780262025799

Adapting Minds: Evolutionary Psychology and the Persistent Quest for Human Nature is a book published by MIT Press written by philosopher of science David Buller, piecing together his criticism of evolutionary psychology. A large portion of the book is dedicated to a critique of empirical findings from three research groups in the field: that of David Buss, that of Cosmides and Tooby, and that of Daly and Wilson. Buller argues that the evolutionary psychology paradigms are "mistaken in almost every detail."
