= Human Behavior and Evolution Society =

International scientific society

The Human Behavior and Evolution Society (HBES) is an interdisciplinary, international society of researchers, primarily from the social and biological sciences, who use modern evolutionary theory to help to discover human nature — including evolved emotional, cognitive and sexual adaptations. It was founded on October 29, 1988 at the University of Michigan.

The official academic journal of the society is Evolution and Human Behavior, and the society has held annual conferences since 1989.

The membership is broadly international and consists of scholars from many fields, such as psychology, anthropology, medicine, law, philosophy, biology, economics and sociology. Despite the diversity, HBES members "all speak the common language of Darwinism."

== Presidents ==
The following individuals have served as presidents of HBES:

- W.D. Hamilton (1988-1989)
- Randy Nesse (1989-1991)
- Martin Daly (1991-1993)
- Napoleon Chagnon (1993-1995)
- Dick Alexander (1995-1997)
- Margo Wilson (1997-1999)
- John Tooby (1999-2001)
- Bill Irons (2001-2003)
- Bobbi Low (2003-2005)
- David Buss (2005-2007)
- Steve Gangestad (2007-2009)
- Pete Richerson (2009-2011)
- Randy Thornhill (2011-2013)
- Mark Flinn (2013-2015)
- Elizabeth Cashdan (2015-2017)
- Rob Kurzban (2017-2018)
- Doug Kenrick (2018-2019)
- Leda Cosmides (2019-2021)
- David Schmitt (2021-)

== See also ==
- Evolutionary developmental psychology
- Evolutionary psychology
- Human behavioral ecology
