= Heide Fehrenbach =

American historian

- Occupation: Historian
- Spouse: David Buller
- Awards: Guggenheim Fellow (2007)

Academic background
- Education: Rutgers University
- Thesis: Cinema in democratizing Germany: the reconstruction of mass culture and national identity in the West, 1945-1960 (1990)
- Doctoral advisor: Victoria de Grazia; Harold Poor

Academic work
- Discipline: History
- Sub-discipline: History of Germany; history of film
- Institutions: Colgate University; Emory University; Northern Illinois University

Heide Fehrenbach is an American historian. A 2007 Guggenheim Fellow, she studies the history of Germany, and she has authored the books Cinema in Democratizing Germany (1995), Race after Hitler (2005), and After the Nazi Racial State (2009) and co-edited the volumes Transactions, Transgressions, Transformations (1999) and Humanitarian Photography: A History (2015). She is Board of Trustees Professor and Distinguished Research Professor at the Northern Illinois University (NIU) Department of History.

== Biography ==
Fehrenbach was born to Verizon worker Gladys Lucia (née Kieselat) and sheet metal mechanic Herbert Frank Fehrenbach. She was raised in Pequannock Township, New Jersey, where she became a New Jersey State Scholar in 1975. She studied at Rutgers University, where she obtained her PhD in modern European history. Her thesis, Cinema in Democratizing Germany: The Reconstruction of Mass Culture and National Identity in the West, 1945–1960, was supervised by Victoria de Grazia and Harold Poor.

In 1990, Fehrenbach started teaching at Colgate University, where she later became assistant professor of history. In 1998, she left Colgate and became Associate Professor of History at Emory University, remaining there until 2001. She later moved to Northern Illinois University (NIU). In 2012, she was appointed a Board of Trustees Professor at NIU.

Fehrenbach won the Conference Group for Central European History's 1997 award for best first book for her 1995 book Cinema in Democratizing Germany, which focuses on the history of film in Germany after the end of World War II. In 1999, she and Uta Poiger co-edited Transactions, Transgressions, Transformations, a volume on the global impact of Americanization. In 2003, she wrote an article for Long Island newspaper Newsday drawing comparisons between the Western Allied invasion of Germany and the United States' then-ongoing invasion of Iraq, particularly the idea of post-war cultural identity in these countries. She later published two books on race in Germany after World War II: Race after Hitler (2005) and, as one of four co-authors, After the Nazi Racial State (2009). In 2007, she was awarded a Guggenheim Fellowship. She and Davide Rodogno co-edited the 2015 volume Humanitarian Photography: A History, part of the Cambridge University Press series Human Rights in History.

At NIU, Fehrenbach teaches courses in areas such as history of Europe (particularly Germany) and film history. In 2007, The Pantagraph reported that her books "were taught at universities around the world".

Fehrenbach is married to philosopher David Buller, who is also a professor at NIU. She lived in DeKalb, Illinois, as of 2020. In September 2004, she participated in a rally protesting the George W. Bush 2004 presidential campaign nearby Dick Cheney's appearance at the NIU's Convocation Center.

== Bibliography ==
- Cinema in Democratizing Germany (1995)
- (ed. with Uta Poiger) Transactions, Transgressions, Transformations (1999)
- Race after Hitler (2005)
- (with Rita Chin, Geoff Eley, and Atina Grossmann) After the Nazi Racial State (2009)
- (ed. with Davide Rodogno) Humanitarian Photography: A History (2015)
