= The Adapted Mind =

1992 book by Jerome H. Barkow, Leda Cosmides, and John Tooby

The Adapted Mind: Evolutionary Psychology and the Generation of Culture
- Cover of the first edition
- Editors: Jerome H. Barkow, Leda Cosmides, John Tooby
- Language: English
- Subject: Evolutionary psychology
- Publisher: Oxford University Press
- Publication date: 1992
- Publication place: United States
- Media type: Print (Hardcover and Paperback)
- Pages: 666 (1995 edition)
- ISBN: 978-0195101072

The Adapted Mind: Evolutionary Psychology and the Generation of Culture is a 1992 book edited by the anthropologists Jerome H. Barkow and John Tooby and the psychologist Leda Cosmides.

First published by Oxford University Press, it is widely considered the foundational text of evolutionary psychology (EP), and outlines Cosmides and Tooby's integration of concepts from evolutionary biology and cognitive psychology, as well as many other concepts that would become important in adaptationist research.

== Summary ==
The theoretical foundations of evolutionary psychology are discussed in the introduction, by Cosmides, Tooby and Barkow, in an essay by Tooby and Cosmides on "The Psychological Foundations of Culture", and an essay by anthropologist Donald Symons "On the Use and Misuse of Darwinism in the Study of Human Behavior". The book also includes empirical research papers meant to introduce topics of interest in evolutionary psychology, such as mating, social and developmental psychology, and perceptual adaptations. It includes contributions from evolutionary psychologists such as Steven Pinker, David Buss, Martin Daly, and Margo Wilson.

In "The Psychological Foundations of Culture", Tooby and Cosmides critique what they call the 'SSSM', short for 'Standard Social Science Model'. The term refers to a metatheory that the authors claim has dominated the behavioral and social sciences throughout the twentieth century, blending radical environmentalism with blind empiricism. The SSSM has retained and reified the nature/nurture dichotomy, and its practitioners have meticulously amassed evidence over the years which 'proves' that the overwhelming majority of psychological phenomena fall in the 'nurture' category. Only some instinctive and primitive biological drives like hunger and thirst have been retained in the 'nature' category.

Most commonly, they continue, evidence for such a preponderance of nurture over nature is drawn from the ethnographic record. A phenomenon (e.g. marriage, religion, reciprocity etc.) is taken to be of purely environmental or cultural origin if it can be shown to manifest in different forms in different cultures or locales. However, this reflects an assumption that biological phenomena are instinctive and inflexible - incapable of taking on different forms.

In the section entitled 'Selection regulates how environments shape organisms' (pp. 82–87), Tooby and Cosmides argue that this view of nature/nurture is deeply flawed. They begin with the statement that natural selection is necessarily responsible for complex biological adaptations, including that extremely complex class of biological phenomena that are human psychological mechanisms.

'The assumption that only the genes are evolved reflects a widespread misconception about the way natural selection acts. Genes are the so-called units of selection, which are inherited, selected, or eliminated, and so they are indeed something that evolves. But every time one gene is selected over another, one design for a developmental program is selected over another as well; by virtue of its structure, this developmental program interacts with some aspects of the environment rather than others, rendering certain environmental features causally relevant to development. So, step by step, as natural selection constructs the species' gene set (chosen from the available mutations), it constructs in tandem the species' developmentally relevant environment (selected from the set of all properties of the world). Thus, both the genes and the developmentally relevant environment are the product of evolution' (p. 84).

With both our genes and our environment "biological" in nature, the nature/nurture dichotomy lacks any meaning. In its place Tooby and Cosmides propose a distinction between "open" and "closed" developmental programs, which refers to the extent to which our various psychological mechanisms can vary in their manifest form depending on the input they receive during development. Some psychological mechanisms (e.g. our visual faculties) will normally assume the same manifest form regardless of the environments they encounter during development (closed developmental programs), while others (e.g. our language faculties) will vary in their manifest form in accordance to the environmental input they receive during development (open developmental mechanisms). However, they argue, whether a mechanism is closed or open, as well as the range of forms it can assume if it is open, is something that is encoded in genetic instructions that have been fine-tuned through millions of years of evolution.

Tooby and Cosmides also critique 'domain-general psychological mechanisms': the psychological faculties which according to the SSSM comprise the human mind. These are general-purpose mechanisms, devoid of situational content, and function equally well regardless of behavioral domain. For example the so-called 'problem-solving methods' with which cognitive psychologists have traditionally busied themselves are abstract rational strategies (e.g. break the problem into smaller parts or start working backwards from the desired end to the present state) that supposedly work the same regardless of if one wants to play a game of chess, order a pizza or find a sexual partner. This academic preoccupation with domain-general mechanisms, they suggest, stems directly from the folk notion of man as a rational being that has largely lost or suppressed its animalesque instincts and now operates primarily according to reason.

Tooby and Cosmides devote the larger part of their essay to establishing that the human mind cannot consist exclusively or even primarily, of domain-general mechanisms. The argument may be summarised as follows: since domain-general mechanisms come without innate content, they must work out the solution to each problem from scratch through costly and potentially lethal trial-and-error. Domain-specific mechanisms, on the other hand, come with content that is specialized for their domain (e.g. mating, foraging, theory of mind etc.) and can therefore immediately dismiss a staggering number of plausible courses of action (which by definition a domain-general mechanism would have to examine one by one) for one or a few favoured alternatives. For this reason domain-specific mechanisms are faster and more effective than their domain-general counterparts and we should expect natural selection to have favoured them.

The authors conclude that the flexible and highly intelligent appearance of human behaviour is not the result of domain-general mechanisms having taken over from older domain-specific mechanisms (or 'instincts'), but the exact opposite; human domain-specific mechanisms have proliferated to the point where man has become competent in an unprecedented number of domains, and can therefore usually employ some motley assortment of these specialized mechanisms for his own novel needs (e.g. he has combined lingual, visual and motor skills to invent the written word, for which no specialized psychological mechanism exists).

== Reception ==
Critics argue that Cosmides and Tooby's conclusions contain several inferential errors and that the authors use untested evolutionary assumptions to eliminate rival reasoning theories.

== See also ==
- Psychological adaptation
- The Evolution of Human Sexuality
- Evolutionary psychiatry
