= Robert Kurzban =

American psychologist (born 1969)

- Born: September 29, 1969 (age 57); Poughkeepsie, New York, U.S.
- Occupation: Former psychologist

Academic background
- Education: BA, Cornell University, 1991; Ph.D, UCSB, 1998
- Thesis: The Social Psychophysics of Cooperation in Groups (1998)
- Doctoral advisor: Leda Cosmides & John Tooby

Academic work
- Discipline: Psychology
- Sub-discipline: Evolutionary Psychology
- Institutions: University of Pennsylvania
- Notable works: Why Everyone (Else) Is a Hypocrite: Evolution and the Modular Mind; The Hidden Agenda of the Political Mind: How Self-Interest Shapes Our Opinions and Why We Won’t Admit It
- Website: robkurzban.com

Robert Kurzban is an American freelance writer and former psychology professor specializing in evolutionary psychology.

== Career ==
Kurzban was a tenured professor of psychology at the University of Pennsylvania until 2018, when he resigned following allegations of inappropriate relationships with undergraduate students. Following his resignation, he was dismissed as the director of the department's honors program. He also resigned as president of the Human Behavior and Evolution Society (HBES) and as Editor-in-Chief of the Society’s journal, Evolution and Human Behavior.

Kurzban was trained by two pioneers in the field of evolutionary psychology, John Tooby and Leda Cosmides, and his research focused on evolutionary approaches to understanding human social behavior. He took an adaptationist view of human psychology, studying the adaptive function, or, survival value, in the adoption of traits by humans. His work aimed at understanding the functions of psychological mechanisms occurring in human social life. He used methods drawn from social psychology, cognitive psychology, and especially experimental economics to research topics including morality, punishment, and mate choice.

Evolutionary psychology has come under attack from a number of critics. Kurzban was active in defending the discipline from prominent detractors and also worked to clarify the principle of cognitive modularity, which plays an important role in the discipline.

He was elected president of HBES in 2017.

Since leaving academia, Kurzban has worked as a freelance writer. He has contributed to both Aporia Magazine and the Aporia podcast.

== Selected publications ==
- Weeden, Jason; Kurzban, Robert (2014). The hidden agenda of the political mind: how self-interest shapes our opinions and why we won't admit it. Princeton University Press. ISBN 978-0-691-16111-2.
- DeScioli, Peter; Kurzban, Robert (2013). "A solution to the mysteries of morality". Psychological Bulletin. 139 (2). American Psychological Association (APA): 477–496. doi:10.1037/a0029065. ISSN 1939-1455. PMID 22747563.
- Kurzban, Robert (2010). Why everyone (else) is a hypocrite: evolution and the modular mind. Princeton University Press. ISBN 978-0-691-15439-8.
- Barrett, H. C.; Kurzban, R. (2006). "Modularity in cognition: Framing the debate". Psychological Review. 113 (3): 628–647. doi:10.1037/0033-295X.113.3.628. PMID 16802884.
- Kurzban, R.; Weeden, J. (2005). "HurryDate: Mate preferences in action". Evolution and Human Behavior. 26 (3): 227–244. Bibcode:2005EHumB..26..227K. doi:10.1016/j.evolhumbehav.2004.08.012.
