= Evolutionary developmental psychology =

Psychology field concerned with Darwinian evolution

Evolutionary developmental psychology (EDP) is a research paradigm that applies the basic principles of evolution by natural selection, to understand the development of human behavior and cognition. It involves the study of both the genetic and environmental mechanisms that underlie the development of social and cognitive competencies, as well as the epigenetic (gene-environment interactions) processes that adapt these competencies to local conditions.

EDP considers both the reliably developing, species-typical features of ontogeny (developmental adaptations), as well as individual differences in behavior, from an evolutionary perspective. While evolutionary views tend to regard most individual differences as the result of either random genetic noise (evolutionary byproducts) and/or idiosyncrasies (for example, peer groups, education, neighborhoods, and chance encounters) rather than products of natural selection, EDP asserts that natural selection can favor the emergence of individual differences via "adaptive developmental plasticity." From this perspective, human development follows alternative life-history strategies in response to environmental variability, rather than following one species-typical pattern of development.

EDP is closely linked to the theoretical framework of evolutionary psychology (EP), but is also distinct from EP in several domains, including: research emphasis (EDP focuses on adaptations of ontogeny, as opposed to adaptations of adulthood); consideration of proximate ontogenetic; environmental factors (i.e., how development happens) in addition to more ultimate factors (i.e., why development happens). These things of which are the focus of mainstream evolutionary psychology.

== History ==
=== Development and evolution ===
Like mainstream evolutionary psychology, EDP is rooted in Charles Darwin's theory of natural selection. Darwin himself emphasized development, using the process of embryology as evidence to support his theory. From The Descent of Man:

"Man is developed from an ovule...which differs in no respect from the ovules of other animals. The embryo itself at a very early period can hardly be distinguished from that of other members of the vertebrate kingdom."

Darwin also published his observations of the development of one of his own sons in 1877, noting the child's emotional, moral, and linguistic development.

Despite this early emphasis on developmental processes, theories of evolution and theories of development have long been viewed as separate, or even opposed to one another (for additional background, see nature versus nurture). Since the advent of the modern evolutionary synthesis, evolutionary theory has been primarily "gene-centric", and developmental processes have often been seen as incidental. Evolutionary biologist Richard Dawkins's appraisal of development in 1973 illustrates this shift: "The details of embryological developmental processes, interesting as they may be, are irrelevant to evolutionary considerations." Similarly, sociobiologist E. O. Wilson regarded ontogenetic variation as "developmental noise".

As a consequence of this shift in perspective, many biologists interested in topics such as embryology and developmental systems subsequently branched off into evolutionary developmental biology.

=== Evolutionary perspectives in developmental psychology ===
Despite the minimization of development in evolutionary theory, early developmental psychology was influenced by evolution. Both Darwin's theory of evolution and Karl Ernst von Baer's developmental principles of ontogeny shaped early thought in developmental psychology. Wilhelm T. Preyer, a pioneer of child psychology, was heavily inspired by Darwin's work and approached the mental development of children from an evolutionary perspective.

However, evolutionary theory has had a limited impact on developmental psychology as a whole, and some authors argue that even its early influence was minimal. Developmental psychology, as with the social sciences in general, has long been resistant to evolutionary theories of development (with some notable exceptions, such as John Bowlby's work on attachment theory). Evolutionary approaches to human behavior were, and to some extent continue to be, considered a form of genetic determinism and dismissive of the role of culture and experience in shaping human behavior (see Standard social science model).

One group of developmental psychologists who have embraced evolutionary perspectives are nativists, who argue than infants possess innate cognitive mechanisms (or modules) which allow them to acquire crucial information, such as language (for a prominent example, see universal grammar).

=== Evolutionary developmental psychology ===
Evolutionary developmental psychology can be viewed as a more focused theoretical framework derived from the larger field of evolutionary psychology (EP). Mainstream evolutionary psychology grew out of earlier movements which applied the principles of evolutionary biology to understand the mind and behavior such as sociobiology, ethology, and behavioral ecology, differing from these earlier approaches by focusing on identifying psychological adaptations rather than adaptive behavior. While EDP theory generally aligns with that of mainstream EP, it is distinguished by a conscious effort to reconcile theories of both evolution and development. EDP theory diverges from mainstream evolutionary psychology in both the degree of importance placed on the environment in influencing behavior, and in how evolution has shaped the development of human psychology.

Advocates of EDP assert that evolutionary psychologists, while acknowledging the role of the environment in shaping behavior and making claims as to its effects, rarely develop explicit models (i.e., predictions of how the environment might shape behavior) to support their claims . EDP seeks to distinguish itself from mainstream evolutionary psychology in this way by embracing a developmental systems approach, and emphasizing that function at one level of organization (e.g., the genetic level) effects organization at adjacent levels of an organization. Developmental systems theorists such as Robert Lickliter point out that the products of development are both genetic and epigenetic, and have questioned the strictly gene-centric view of evolution. However, some authors have rebutted the claim that mainstream evolutionary psychologists do not integrate developmental theory into their theoretical programs, and have further questioned the value of developmental systems theory (see Criticism).

Additionally, evolutionary developmental psychologists emphasize research on psychological development and behaviors across the lifespan. Pioneers of EDP contrast their work with that of mainstream evolutionary psychologists, who they argue focus primarily on adults, especially on behaviors related to socializing and mating.

Evolutionary developmental psychologists have worked to integrate evolutionary and developmental theories, attempting to synthesize the two without discarding the theoretical foundations of either. This effort is evident in the types of questions which researchers working in the EDP paradigm ask; in reference to Nikolaas Tinbergen's four categories of questions, EP typically focuses on evolutionary ("Why") questions, while EDP explicitly integrates proximate questions ("How"), with the assumption that a greater understanding of the former category will yield insights into the latter. See the following table for an overview of Tinbergen's questions.

		Sequential vs. Static Perspective	
		Historical/Developmental Explanation of current form in terms of a historical sequence	Current Form Explanation of the current form of species
How vs. Why Questions	Proximate How an individual organism's structures function	Ontogeny Developmental explanations for changes in individuals, from DNA to their current form	Mechanism Mechanistic explanations for how an organism's structures work
How vs. Why Questions	Evolutionary Why a species evolved the structures (adaptations) it has	Phylogeny The history of the evolution of sequential changes in a species over many generations	Adaptation A species trait that evolved to solve a reproductive or survival problem in the ancestral environment

== Basic assumptions ==
The following list summarizes the broad theoretical assumptions of EDP. From "Evolutionary Developmental Psychology," in The Handbook of Evolutionary Psychology:

1. All evolutionarily-influenced characteristics in the phenotype of adults develop, and this requires examining not only the functioning of these characteristics in adults but also their ontogeny.
2. All evolved characteristics develop via continuous and bidirectional gene-environment interactions that emerge dynamically over time.
3. Infants and children are prepared by natural selection to process some information more readily than others.
4. Development is constrained by genetic, environmental, and cultural factors.
5. Infants and children show a high degree of developmental plasticity and adaptive sensitivity to context.
6. An extended childhood is needed in which to learn the complexities of human social communities.
7. Many aspects of childhood serve as preparations for adulthood and were selected over the course of evolution (deferred adaptations).
8. Some characteristics of infants and children were selected to serve an adaptive function at specific times in development and not as preparations for adulthood (ontogenetic adaptations).

== Developmental adaptations ==
EDP assumes that natural selection creates adaptations for specific stages of development, rather than only specifying adult states. Frequently, EDP researchers seek to identify such adaptations, which have been subdivided into deferred adaptations, ontogenetic adaptations, and conditional adaptations.

=== Deferred adaptations ===
Some behaviors or traits exhibited during childhood or adolescence may have been selected to serve as preparations for adult life, a type of adaptation that evolutionary developmental psychologists have named "deferred adaptations". Sex differences in children's play may be an example of this type of adaptation: higher frequencies of "rough-and-tumble" play among boys, as well as content differences in fantasy play (cross-culturally, girls engage in more "parenting" play than boys), seem to serve as early preparation for the roles that men and women play in many extant contemporary societies, and, presumably, played over human evolutionary history.

=== Ontogenetic adaptations ===
In contrast to deferred adaptations, which function to prepare individuals for future environments (i.e., adulthood), ontogenetic adaptations adapt individuals to their current environment. These adaptations serve a specific function during a particular period of development, after which they are discarded. Ontogenetic adaptations can be physiological (for example, when fetal mammals deriving nutrition and oxygen from the placenta before birth, but no longer utilize the placenta after birth) and psychological. David F. Bjorklund has argued that the imitation of facial gestures by infants, which has a predictable developmental window and seemingly different functions at different ages, shows evidence of being an ontogenetic adaptation.

=== Conditional adaptations ===
EDP emphasizes that children display considerable developmental plasticity, and proposes a special type of adaptation to facilitate adaptive developmental plasticity, called a conditional adaptation. Conditional adaptations detect and respond to relevant environmental cues, altering developmental pathways in ways which better adapt an individual to their particular environment. These adaptations allow organisms to implement alternative and contingent life history strategies, depending on environmental factors.

== Related research ==
=== Social learning and the evolution of childhood ===
The social brain (or Machiavellian) hypothesis posits that the emergence of a complex social environment (e.g., larger group sizes) served as a key selection pressure in the evolution of human intelligence. Among primates, larger brains result in an extension of the juvenile period, and some authors argue that humans evolved (and/or expanded) novel developmental stages, childhood and adolescence, in response to increasing social complexity and sophisticated social learning.

While many species exhibit social learning to some degree and seemingly possess behavioral traditions (i.e., culture), humans can transmit cultural information across many generations with very high fidelity. High fidelity cultural learning is what many have argued is necessary for cumulative cultural evolution, and has only been definitively observed in humans, although arguments have been made for chimpanzees, orangutans, and New Caledonian crows. Developmentally-oriented researchers have proposed that over-imitation of behavioral models facilitates cultural learning, a phenomenon which emerges in children by age three and is seemingly absent in chimpanzees.

=== Cooperation and prosociality ===
Behaviors that benefit other members of one's social group, particularly those which appear costly to the prosocial or "altruistic" individual, have received considerable attention from disciplines interested in the evolution of behavior. Michael Tomasello has argued that cooperation and prosociality are evolved characteristics of human behavior, citing the emergence of "helping" behavior early in development (observed among 18-24 month old infants) as one piece of evidence. Researchers investigating the ontogeny and evolution of human cooperation design experiments intended to reveal the prosociality of infants and young children, then compare children's performance with that of other animals, typically chimpanzees. While some of the helping behaviors exhibited by infants and young children has also been observed in chimpanzees, preschool-age children tend to display greater prosociality than both human-raised and semi-free-ranging adult chimps.

=== Life history strategies and developmental plasticity ===
EDP researchers emphasize that evolved strategies are context dependent, in the sense that a strategy which is optimal in one environment will often be sub-optimal in another environment. They argue that this will result in natural selection favoring "adaptive developmental plasticity," allowing an organism to alter its developmental trajectory in response to environmental cues.

Related to this is the idea of a life history strategy, which can be conceptualized as a chain of resource-allocation decisions (e.g., allocating resources towards growth or towards reproduction) that an organism makes. Biologists have used life history theory to characterize between-species variation in resource-allocation in terms of a fast-slow continuum (see r/K selection theory), and, more recently, some anthropologists and psychologists have applied this continuum to understand within-species variation in trade-offs between reproductive and somatic effort.

Some authors argue that childhood environment and early life experiences are highly influential in determining an individual's life history strategy. Factors such as exposure to violence, harsh child-rearing, and environmental unpredictability (e.g., frequent moving, unstable family composition) have been shown to correlate with the proposed behavioral indicators of "fast" life history strategies (e.g., early sexual maturation, unstable couple relationships, impulsivity, and reduced cooperation), where current reproduction is prioritized over future reproduction.

== Criticism ==
John Tooby, Leda Cosmides, and H. Clark Barrett have refuted claims that mainstream evolutionary psychology neglects development, arguing that their discipline is, in reality, exceptionally interested in and highly considerate of development. In particular, they cite cross-cultural studies as a sort of natural developmental "experiment," which can reveal the influence of culture in shaping developmental outcomes. The authors assert that the arguments of developmental systems theorists consists largely of truisms, of which evolutionary psychologists are well aware, and that developmental systems theory has no scientific value because it fails to generate any predictions.

Debra Lieberman similarly objected to the characterization of evolutionary psychology as ignorant of developmental principles. Lieberman argued that both developmental systems theorists and evolutionary psychologists share a common goal of uncovering species-typical cognitive architecture, as well as the ontogeny of that architecture.

== See also ==
- Cognitive model § Mother-fetus cognitive model
- Developmental psychology
- Differential susceptibility
- Dual inheritance theory
- Epigenetic theory
- Evolutionary educational psychology
- Evolutionary psychology
- FOXP2 and human evolution
- Human behavioral ecology
- Life history theory
- Nature and nurture
- Wikipedia:Research resources/Evolution and human behavior

== Relevant journals ==
- Evolution and Development Research relevant to interface of evolutionary and developmental biology
- Evolutionary Psychology (journal) Special Edition on Evolutionary Developmental Psychology (2014)
