= Cinderella effect =

Higher prevalence of mistreatment by stepparents

In evolutionary psychology, the Cinderella effect describes the phenomenon of a higher incidence of child abuse and mistreatment by stepparents than biological parents. It takes its name from the fairy tale character Cinderella, a girl who is mistreated by her stepmother and stepsisters. Evolutionary psychologists describe this effect as being a byproduct of a bias towards biological family and a conflict between reproductive partners investing in young children who are unrelated to one partner.

== Background ==
In the early 1970s, a theory arose on the connection between stepparents and child maltreatment. In 1973, forensic psychiatrist P. D. Scott summarized information on a sample of "fatal battered-baby cases" perpetrated in anger, and found that 15 of the 29 murders he considered, or 52%, were committed by stepfathers. Although initially there was no analysis of this raw data, empirical evidence has since been collected on what is now called the Cinderella effect through official records and reports.

Since the 1970s, scholars have sought data regarding the validity of the Cinderella effect from a variety of sources including official reports of child abuse, clinical data, victim reports, and official homicide data and have found a direct relationship between step-parents and child abuse. Studies have concluded that "stepchildren in Canada, Great Britain, and the United States indeed incur greatly elevated risk of child maltreatment of various sorts, especially lethal beatings."

In circumstances where the family contains both biological children and step-children, studies have found that step-parents generally favor their biological children. In such families, stepchildren were exclusively targeted 9 out of 10 times in one study and in 19 of 22 in another. In addition to displaying higher rates of negative behaviors toward stepchildren, stepparents displayed fewer positive behaviors toward stepchildren compared to the biological parents. For example, on average, stepparents invested less in education, played with stepchildren less, and took stepchildren to the doctor less, among other things. This discrimination against stepchildren does not align with the typical abuse statistics involving the overall population given, "the following additional facts: (1) when child abuse is detected, it is often found that all the children in the home have been victimized; and (2) stepchildren are almost always the eldest children in the home whereas the general (albeit slight) tendency in families of uniform parentage is for the youngest to be the most frequent victims."

== Evolutionary psychology theory ==
Evolutionary psychologists Martin Daly and Margo Wilson propose that the Cinderella effect is a direct consequence of the modern evolutionary theory of inclusive fitness, especially parental investment theory. They argue that human child rearing is so prolonged and costly that "a parental psychology shaped by natural selection is unlikely to be indiscriminate." According to them, "research concerning animal social behavior provides a rationale for expecting parents to be discriminative in their care and affection, and more specifically, to discriminate in favor of their own young." Inclusive fitness theory proposes a selective criterion for the evolution of social traits, where social behavior that is costly to an individual organism can nevertheless emerge when there is a statistical likelihood that significant benefits of that social behavior accrue to (the survival and reproduction of) other organisms whom also carry the social trait (most straightforwardly, accrue to close genetic relatives). Under such conditions, a net overall increase in reproduction of the social trait in future generations can result.

The initial presentation of inclusive fitness theory (in the mid 1960s) focused on creating a mathematical case for the possibility of social evolution, but it also speculated possible mechanisms whereby a social trait could effectively achieve this necessary statistical correlation between its likely bearers. Two possibilities were considered: 1) That a social trait might reliably operate straightforwardly via social context in species where close relatives are usually concentrated in a local home area where they were born ("viscous populations"); 2) That genetic detection mechanisms ("supergenes") might emerge that go beyond statistical correlations, and reliably detect actual genetic relatedness between the social actors using direct "kin recognition". The relative place of these two broad types of social mechanisms has been debated (see Kin selection and Kin recognition), but many biologists consider "kin recognition" to be an important possible mechanism. Martin Daly and Margo Wilson follow this second mechanism, and expect that parents "discriminate in favor of their own young"; i.e., their actual close relatives.

=== Daly and Wilson research ===
Abundant data on the mistreatment of stepchildren have been collected and interpreted by psychologists Martin Daly and Margo Wilson, who study with an emphasis in Neuroscience and Behavior at McMaster University. Their first measure of the validity of the Cinderella effect was based on data from the American Humane Association (A.H.A.), an archive of child abuse reports in the United States holding over twenty thousand reports. These records led Wilson and Daly to conclude that "a child under three years of age who lived with one genetic parent and one stepparent in the United States in 1976 was about seven times more likely to become a validated child-abuse case in the records than one who dwelt with two genetic parents." Their overall findings demonstrate that children residing with stepparents have a higher risk of abuse even when other factors are considered.

==== Explanation ====
All organisms face trade-offs as to how to invest their time, energy, risk, and other resources, so investment in one domain (e.g., parental investment) generally takes away from their ability to invest in other domains (e.g. mating effort, growth, or investment in other offspring). Investment in non-genetic children therefore reduces an individual's ability to invest in itself or its genetic children, without directly bringing reproductive benefits. Thus, from an evolutionary biology perspective, one would not expect organisms to regularly and deliberately care for offspring not their own.

Daly and Wilson point out that infanticide is an extreme form of biasing parental investment that is widely practiced in the animal world. For example, when an immigrant male lion enters a pride, it is not uncommon for him to kill the cubs fathered by other males. Since the pride can only provide support for a limited number of cubs to survive to adulthood, the killing of the cubs in competition with the new male's potential offspring increases the chances of his progeny surviving to maturity. In addition, the act of infanticide speeds the return to sexual receptivity in the females, allowing for the male to father his own offspring in a timelier manner. These observations indicate that in other animals, males employ certain measures to ensure that parental investment is geared specifically toward their own offspring.

Unlike the lion however, humans in a step parenting situation face a more complicated trade-off since they cannot completely disown their partner's offspring from a previous relationship, as they would risk losing sexual access to their partner and any chance of producing potential offspring. Thus, according to Daly and Wilson, step-parental investment can be viewed as mating effort to ensure the possibility of future reproduction with the parent of their stepchild. This mating effort hypothesis suggests that humans will tend to invest more in their genetic offspring and invest just enough in their stepchildren. It is from this theoretical framework that Daly and Wilson argue that instances of child abuse towards non-biological offspring should be more frequent than towards biological offspring.

One would therefore expect greater parental responsiveness towards one's own offspring than towards the offspring of others, and this will result in more positive outcomes and fewer negative outcomes towards one's own children than towards other children in which one is expected to invest (i.e., stepchildren). "If child abuse is a behavioral response influenced by natural selection, then it is more likely to occur when there are reduced inclusive fitness payoffs owing to uncertain or low relatedness". Owing to these adaptations from natural selection, child abuse is more likely to be committed by stepparents than genetic parents—both are expected to invest heavily in the children, but genetic parents will have greater child-specific parental love that promotes positive care taking and inhibits maltreatment.

Daly and Wilson also note that this parental love can explain why genetic offspring are more immune to lashing out by parents. They assert that, "Child-specific parental love is the emotional mechanism that permits people to tolerate—even to rejoice in—those long years of expensive, unreciprocated parental investment". They point to a study comparing natural father and stepfather families as support for the notion that stepparents do not view their stepchildren the same as their biological children, and likewise, children do not view their stepparents the same as their biological parents. This study, based on a series of questionnaires which were then subjected to statistical analyses, reports that children are less likely to go to their stepfathers for guidance and that stepfathers rate their stepchildren less positively than do natural fathers.

Daly and Wilson's reports on the over-representation of stepparents in child homicide and abuse statistics support the evolutionary principle of maximizing one's inclusive fitness, formalized under Hamilton's rule, which helps to explain why humans will preferentially invest in close kin. Adoption statistics also substantiate this principle, in that non-kin adoptions represent a minority of worldwide adoptions. Research into the high adoption rates of Oceania shows that childlessness is the most common reason for adopting and that, in the eleven populations for which data were available, a large majority of adoptions involved a relative with a coefficient of relatedness greater than or equal to 0.125 (e.g., genetic cousins). It is also observed that parents with both biological and adopted children bias the partitioning of their estates in favor of the biological children, demonstrating again that parental behavior corresponds to the principles of kin selection.

==== Methods ====
In their 1985 Canadian sample, Daly and Wilson classify the frequencies of different living arrangements (two natural parents, one natural parent, one natural parent with one stepparent, or other) according to child age. This was accomplished by administering a randomized telephone survey.

Records of child abuse from children's aid organizations as well as police reports on runaways and juvenile offenders were then used to determine whether children from step-parental living situations were over-represented as abuse victims when compared to the demographic data gathered from the telephone survey data. The results indicate that the only living situation that has a significant correlation to increased child abuse is one natural parent and one stepparent in the same household. While rates of running away and crime were comparable for children living with stepparents and children of single-parents, abuse rates for children living with stepparents were much higher.

Daly and Wilson examined several potentially confounding variables in their research, including socioeconomic status, family size, and maternal age at childbirth. However, only minor differences between natural-parent and stepparent families with respect to these factors were found, indicating that none of these are major contributing factors to the observed Cinderella effect.

=== Attachment theory ===
Evolutionary psychologists have also suggested that one of the causes of stepchild abuse may be the lack of a parental attachment bond that the mother would normally form with her own child. An attachment bond will, in general, be more secure if formed before the age of two, and adoption can often disrupt the development of this bond. An infant who is fed by the primary parental figure, usually the mother, and has the mother present during severely physically painful events will have formed a stronger parental attachment bond, and either a consistent omission of the mother from this process or an alteration between two people (the original mother and the adoptive mother) can cause either an insecure attachment or disorganized attachment from the parent to the child. As a result, it is highly recommended by most psychologists that the adoptive mother be present very early in the infant's life, preferably immediately after its birth, to avoid attachment disruptions and attachment disorders. This theory cannot be a whole explanation for the Cinderella effect, as psychological research has shown that secure attachment bonds can be developed between a parent and adopted child, and the quality of the relationship between parent and child will more often depend on the child's pre-adoption experiences, such as length of time in social care and previous trauma, more than characteristics of the parents.

=== Misunderstandings ===
It is sometimes argued that this evolutionary psychological account does not explain why the majority of stepparents do not abuse their partners' children, or why a significant minority of genetic parents do abuse their own offspring. However, their argument is based on a misunderstanding: the evolutionary psychological account is that (all else equal) parents will love their own children more than other people's children – it does not argue that stepparents will "want" to abuse their partner's children, or that genetic parenthood is absolute proof against abuse. Under this account, step-parental care is seen as "mating effort" towards the genetic parent, such that most interactions between stepparent and stepchildren will be generally positive or at least neutral, just usually not as positive as interactions between the genetic parent and the child would be.

Robert Burgess and Alicia Dais offer an explanatory model for child maltreatment that adds on to the evolutionary psychological theories regarding child maltreatment. Burgess and Dais state that ecological conditions in conjunction with conflicting parent and child personality traits may also play a role in child maltreatment seen in the Cinderella effect.

== Supportive evidence ==
Strong support for the Cinderella effect as described by Daly and Wilson comes from a study of unintentional childhood fatal injuries in Australia. Tooley et al. follow the argument of Daly and Wilson to extend the Cinderella effect from cases of abuse to incidents of unintentional fatalities. Children are not only vulnerable to abuse by their parents, but they are also dependent on their parents for supervision and protection from a variety of other harms. Given that parental supervision is fundamentally correlated to incidence of unintentional childhood injury as shown by Wadsworth et al. and Peterson & Stern, Tooley et al. posit that selective pressures would favor an inclination towards parental vigilance against threats to offspring well-being. Tooley et al. further argue that parental vigilance is not as highly engaged in stepparents as genetic parents, therefore placing stepchildren at greater risk for unintentional injury.

Based on data gathered from the Australia National Coroners' Information System, stepchildren under five years of age are two to fifteen times more likely to experience an unintentional fatal injury, especially drowning, than genetic children. Additionally, the study finds that the risks of unintentional fatal injury are not significantly higher for genetic children in single parent homes versus two-parent homes. This difference suggests that removing one biological parent from the home does not significantly increase risk to the children, but that adding a non-biological parent to the home results in a drastic increase in the risk of unintentional fatal injury. Despite the fact that adding a stepparent to the home increases the available resources in terms of supervision in comparison to a single-parent home, risk of unintentional fatal injury still significantly rises. This higher risk of injury for stepchildren can be attributed to the fact that stepparents occupy the same supervisory role as a genetic parent, yet they have a lower intrinsic commitment to protecting the child and therefore are less likely to be adequately vigilant. The authors conclude that the Cinderella effect applies not only to purposeful abuse by stepparents, but is also relevant to explaining increased rates of accidental fatalities among stepchildren.

Furthermore, a study of parental investment behaviors among American men living in Albuquerque, New Mexico, reveals a trend of increasing financial expenditures on genetic offspring in comparison to step-offspring, which also suggests that parents are less inclined to preserve the well-being of stepchildren. The study assesses paternal investment based on four measures: the probability that a child attends college, the probability that the child receives money for college, the total money spent on children, and the amount of time per week spent with children. Four different classifications of father-child relationships are examined and compared, including fathers living with their genetic children and stepfathers living with the stepchildren of their current mates. Though the study finds a clear trend of increasing investment in genetic children, the data also shows that stepfathers do still invest substantially in stepchildren. The authors explain the parental investment exhibited by stepfathers towards stepchildren as possibly motivated by the potential to improve the quality or increase the duration of the man's relationship with the stepchildren's mother. This studied corroborates the findings of Lynn White, that stepparents in general provide less social support to stepchildren than their genetic children.

Though the general trend of the data from this study supports the Cinderella effect, Anderson and colleagues note that the observed differences between investment in children and stepchildren might be slightly reduced by a few confounding factors. For example, the authors point out that step parenting is a self-selective process, and that when all else is equal, men who bond with unrelated children are more likely to become stepfathers, a factor that is likely to be a confounding variable in efforts to study the Cinderella effect. Anderson and colleagues also conducted a similar study of Xhosa students in South Africa that analyzes the same four classifications of adult-child relationships, and this study offers similar results to those observed among men in Albuquerque.

Additionally, a study of Hadza foragers in Tanzania by Marlowe also finds evidence of decreased care provided by men to stepchildren when compared with genetic children. The author uses the Mann-Whitney U-tests to evaluate most of the observed differences in care exhibited towards children and stepchildren, and finds that Hadza men spend less time with (U=96), communicate less with (U=94.5), nurture less, and never play with their stepchildren. Marlowe further argues that any care that is provided towards stepchildren is likely attributable to the man's mating efforts and not parental interest in the well-being of the stepchildren.

In further support of the Cinderella effect as elaborated by Daly and Wilson, a study conducted in a rural village in Trinidad demonstrates that in households containing both genetic children and stepchildren, fathers devote approximately twice as much time to interaction with genetic offspring in comparison to stepchildren. Additionally, this study finds that the duration of the relationship between the stepfather and stepchildren is negatively correlated with the relative proportion of interaction time and positively correlated with the relative proportion of antagonistic interactions between the two. As a proportion of total time spent interacting with genetic and stepchildren, stepfathers are shown to have approximately 75 percent more antagonistic interactions with stepchildren. In this study, antagonistic interactions are defined as involving physical or verbal combat or an expression of injury. This includes, for example, spanking, screaming, crying, and arguing. The duration of the relationship between genetic fathers and children shows a positive correlation with both relative proportion of interaction time and antagonistic interaction. The author argues that these results show that in terms of time invested, men favor their children over stepchildren, and this preference is not attributable to the duration of the adult-child relationship, a factor which is sometimes believed to be a confounding variable in the Cinderella effect. Though this study does claim a significant increase in antagonistic behavior between stepparents and stepchildren and therefore supports the Cinderella effect, it also notes that only six percent of all the observed parent-child interactions were considered antagonistic, and that the researchers never noticed any blatant physical child abuse.

== Criticism ==
=== David Buller ===
Philosopher of science David Buller, as a part of his general critique of evolutionary psychology, has reviewed Daly and Wilson's data. He argues that evolutionary psychology (EP) mistakenly attempts to discover human psychological adaptations rather than "the evolutionary causes of psychological traits." Buller also argues that Daly and Wilson's 1985 Canadian sample included cases of sexual abuse as well as cases of unintentional omission, such as not buckling a child's seatbelt in the car. Buller asserts that unintentional omission does not fall under the realm of dangerous acts, and rather should be designated "maltreatment". He argues that since sexual abuse is not often accompanied by physical abuse, it is unreasonable to assume that it is motivated by the same kind of psychological mechanism as child homicide. Buller also points out that the conclusion that non-biological parents are more likely to abuse children is contradicted by the fact that even if the rate of abuse among stepparents was disproportionate, the lowest rate of child abuse is found among adoptive parents. Daly and Wilson respond to Buller's criticism by stating that Buller confuses the empirical statistical findings, which define the Cinderella effect, with the proposed theoretical framework, which offers an evolutionary explanation for the data.

Buller also argues that Daly and Wilson's findings are inherently biased since they use data from official documents, and the officials collecting that data are trained to take special notice of stepparents versus biological parents. Furthermore, Buller states that since Daly and Wilson rely on official reports (such as death certificates) for their data, and that this data is inherently biased against stepparents. He cites a Colorado study, in which it was found that maltreatment fatalities were more likely to be correctly reported on death certificates when an unrelated individual was the perpetrator rather than when a parent was the perpetrator, suggesting that the data is empirically skewed to support the Cinderella effect. According to this study, by Crume et al., when the perpetrator of the murder was a parent, maltreatment was correctly noted on the death certificate only 46 percent of the time. Furthermore, they found that when the perpetrator was an "Other unrelated (including boyfriend)" individual, maltreatment was reported on the death certificate 86 percent of the time, significantly higher than for parents. Although these statistics seem to provide evidence of bias against stepparents, further review of the data undermines this conclusion. As Crume et al. and Daly and Wilson note, maltreatment was only likely to be reported on the death certificates 47 percent of the time in the case of "other relatives (including step-parents)," which represents a marginal increase from the amount of parental maltreatment. Therefore, as Daly and Wilson respond to Buller's critique, this does not seem to be a significant source of error in studying the Cinderella effect and does not provide evidence for inherent bias in their data.

=== Temrin et al. Sweden study ===
The findings of Daly and Wilson have been called into question by one study of child homicides in Sweden between 1975 and 1995, which found that children living in households with a non-genetic parent were not at an increased risk of homicide when compared to children living with both genetic parents. The study, published in 2000 and conducted by Temrin and colleagues argued that when Daly and Wilson classified homicides according to family situation, they did not account for the genetic relatedness of the parent who actually committed the crime. In the Swedish sample, in two out of the seven homicides with a genetic and non-genetic parent, the offender was actually the genetic parent and thus these homicides do not support Daly and Wilson's definition of the Cinderella effect.

Daly and Wilson attribute the contrasting findings of the Swedish study to an analytical oversight. Temrin and colleagues neglect to consider the fact that the proportion of children in living situations with a stepparent is not constant for all child age groups, but rather increases with age. After correcting for age differences, the Swedish data set produces results in accordance with the previous findings of Daly and Wilson. The Swedish sample does show, however, decreased risk to children living with a stepparent compared to the North American samples collected by Daly and Wilson, suggesting that there is some degree of cross-cultural variation in the Cinderella effect.

=== Alternative hypotheses ===
It has been noted by multiple researchers that child abuse is an intricate issue and is affected by other factors. Daly and Wilson state, however, that even if evolutionary psychology cannot account for every instance of step-parental abuse, this does not invalidate their empirical findings.

Burgess and Drais propose that child maltreatment is too complex to be explained fully by genetic relatedness alone and cite other reasons for child maltreatment, such as social factors, ecological factors and child traits such as disability and age. However, they also note that these traits are simply indicative, and do not inevitably lead to child maltreatment. Temrin and colleagues also suggest that there may be other factors involved with child homicide, such as prior convictions, drug abuse problems, lost custody battles and mental health problems.

In 1984, Giles-Sims and David Finkelhor categorized and evaluated five possible hypotheses that could explain the Cinderella effect: "social-evolutionary theory," "normative theory," "stress theory," "selection factors," and "resource theory." The social-evolutionary theory is based on the proposal that non-genetically related parents will invest less in costly parental duties, due to the fact that their genes are not being passed on by that individual. The normative theory proposes that, due to genetic repercussions, incest among genetically related individuals is a widespread taboo and would thus be less common among biological relatives. They propose that incest among step families would be less taboo, since there is no risk of genetic degradation. The stress theory proposes that increased stressors, which are inherently more common among stepfamilies, cause an increased risk of abuse. The selection factors theory proposes that individuals who are likely to be stepparents (divorcees) are likely to be inherently more violent due to emotional disturbances, aggressive impulses, and self-esteem issues. Due to this, stepparents as a group would have a higher proportion of individuals with violent-prone characteristics, which would suggest that the abuse is happening due to personality factors, rather than the step-parental relationship directly. Finally, according to resource theory, individuals who contribute resources are granted authority, while individuals who lack resources are denied authority and more likely to resort to violence to obtain authority. It is therefore hypothesized that stepparents who are able to contribute resources to a family and have those resources be accepted by the family are less likely to be abusive. However, this hypothesis had yet to be tested directly on step families.

== See also ==
- Rotten kid theorem
- Cinderella complex
- Maternal bond
- Nuclear family
- Paternal bond
- The WAVE Trust
