= William Irons =

William Irons may refer to:

- William Josiah Irons (1812–1883), Church of England priest and theological writer
- Bill Irons, American anthropologist
