= Benedict Jones =

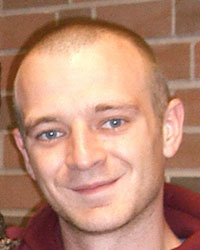
Benedict Jones

Benedict Jones is a research psychologist and lecturer at the University of Strathclyde who studies the biological and social factors underlying face perception and preferences. He received his PhD from the University of St Andrews in 2005, where he studied with David Perrett.

He is best known for work on the hormonal mechanisms that underlie face preferences, especially how hormonal fluctuations during the menstrual cycle and pregnancy affect preferences for a healthy appearance.

== Publications ==
- Jones, BC, DeBruine, LM, Little, AC, Burriss, RB, Feinberg, DR (2007). Social transmission of face preferences among humans. Proceedings of the Royal Society of London, B.
- Jones, BC, DeBruine, LM, Little, AC, Conway, CA, Feinberg, DR (2006). Integrating gaze direction and expression in preferences for attractive faces. Psychological Science, 17(7): 588–591.
- Jones, BC, Little, AC, Boothroyd, LG, DeBruine, LM, Feinberg, DR, Law Smith, MJ, Cornwell, RE, Moore, FR, Perrett, DI (2005). Commitment to relationships and preferences for femininity and apparent health in faces are strongest on days of the menstrual cycle when progesterone level is high. Hormones and Behavior, 48(3): 283–290.
- Jones, BC, Perrett, DI, Little, AC, Boothroyd, LG, Cornwell, RE, Feinberg, DR, Tiddeman, BP, Whiten, S, Pitman, RM, Hillier, SG, Burt, DM, Stirrat, MR, Law Smith, MJ, Moore, FR (2005). Menstrual cycle, pregnancy and oral contraceptive use alter attraction to apparent health in faces. Proceedings of the Royal Society of London, B, 272(1561): 347–354.
- Little, AC, DeBruine, LM, Jones, BC (all 3 authors contributed equally) (2005). Sex-contingent face aftereffects suggest distinct neural populations code male and female faces. Proceedings of the Royal Society of London, B, 272(1578): 2283–2287.
- Jones, BC, Little, AC, Boothroyd, LG, Feinberg, DR, Cornwell, RE, DeBruine, LM, Roberts, SC, Penton-Voak, IS, Law Smith, MJ, Moore, FR, Davis, HP, Perrett, DI (2005). Women's physical and psychological condition independently predict their preference for apparent health in faces. Evolution and Human Behavior, 26(6): 451–457.
- Jones, BC, Little, AC, Feinberg, DR, Penton-Voak, IS, Tiddeman, BP, Perrett, DI (2004). The relationship between shape symmetry and perceived skin condition in male facial attractiveness. Evolution and Human Behavior, 25: 249–30.
- Jones, BC, Little, AC, Burt, DM, Perrett, DI (2004). When facial attractiveness is only skin deep. Perception, 33: 569–576.
- Jones, BC, Jones, BT, Blundell, L, Bruce, G (2002). Social users of alcohol and cannabis who detect substance-related changes in a change blindness paradigm report higher levels of use than those detecting substance-neutral changes. Psychopharmacology, 165(4): 93–96.
- Jones, BC, Little, AC, Penton-Voak, IS, Tiddeman, BP, Burt, DM, Perrett, DI (2001). Facial symmetry and judgements of apparent health: Support for a 'good genes' explanation of the attractiveness-symmetry relationship. Evolution and Human Behavior, 22: 417–429.
