= Lars Penke =

German psychologist

- Born: 2 September 1978 (age 47); Detmold, Germany
- Education: Humboldt University of Berlin
- Known for: Differential psychology Evolutionary psychology Personality psychology
- Scientific career
- Fields: Psychology
- Institutions: Georg August University of Göttingen
- Thesis: Approaches to an Evolutionary Personality Psychology: The Case of Sociosexuality (2007)
- Doctoral advisor: Jens Asendorpf

Lars Penke (born 2 September 1978) is a professor of biological personality psychology at the Georg August University of Göttingen in Germany. He is also an associate member of the Centre for Cognitive Ageing and Cognitive Epidemiology at the University of Edinburgh in the United Kingdom. His research focuses on evolutionary and personality psychology, including the evolutionary importance of psychological traits such as human intelligence. He is a member of the International Society for Intelligence Research and the Human Behavior and Evolution Society.
