= Daniel Fessler =

American academic

Daniel Fessler is a professor of biological anthropology at the University of California, Los Angeles, working in the fields of evolutionary psychology, evolutionary anthropology, and evolutionary medicine. He was an editor-in-chief of journal of Evolution and Human Behavior.
