= Darwinian anthropology =

Analytic approach

Darwinian anthropology describes an approach to anthropological analysis which employs various theories from Darwinian evolutionary biology. Whilst there are a number of areas of research that can come under this broad description some specific research projects have been closely associated with the label. A prominent example is the project that developed in the mid 1970s with the goal of applying sociobiological perspectives to explain patterns of human social relationships, particularly kinship patterns across human cultures.

This kinship-focused Darwinian anthropology was a significant intellectual forebear of evolutionary psychology, and both draw on biological theories of the evolution of social behavior (in particular inclusive fitness theory) upon which the field of sociobiology was founded.

== Overview ==
In 1974 the biologist Richard D. Alexander published an article The Evolution of Social Behavior which drew upon W. D. Hamilton's work on inclusive fitness and kin selection and noted that:

Although ten years have passed since Hamilton's landmark papers, apparently only a single social scientist (Campbell, 31) has made a distinct effort to incorporate kin selection into theories of human altruism... But so have the biologists, for one reason or another, failed to consider the enormous literature on topics like kinship systems and reciprocity in human behavior.

Amongst other suggestions, Alexander suggested that certain patterns of social cooperation documented by ethnographers, in particular the avunculate ('mother's brother') relationship, could be explained in reference to individuals pursuing a strategy of individual inclusive fitness maximization under conditions of low certainty-of-paternity. This hypothesis was subsequently taken up and elaborated in a series of studies by other Darwinian anthropologists:

The hypothesis follows that matrilineal inheritance is a cultural trait that evolved in response to low probability of paternity. [...] The paternity hypothesis was rescued and made explicit in the context of modern evolutionary theory by Alexander in 1974. Over the next 10 years this provided the impetus leading to numerous theoretical refinements and scholarly and empirical investigations (Flinn 1981; Gaulin & Schlegel 1980; Greene 1978; Hartung 1981b; Kurland 1979).(Hartung 1985,661-663)

Ultimately these analyses were considered unsuccessful, and were specifically criticized by other sociobiologists on a number of grounds. One problem was said to be that interpreting inclusive fitness theory to imply that individuals have evolved the characteristic of pursuing strategies to maximize their own 'inclusive fitness' is erroneous; the theory should instead be interpreted to describe selection pressures on genes:

Alexander's argument... erred through looking at things from the point of view of an individual... I believe this kind of error is all too easy to make when we use the technical term ‘fitness’ [of individuals]. This is why I have avoided using the term in this book. There is really only one entity whose point of view matters in evolution, and that entity is the selfish gene.(Dawkins 1989 (1976), 137 emphasis in original)

A related problem was that, in assuming that individuals simply operate as inclusive fitness maximizing agents, any investigation of the proximate psychological mechanisms that mediate social behaviors was ignored. Symons made this observation in his 1989 Critique of Darwinian Anthropology:

DA's central hypothesis is that “evolved behavioral tendencies” cause human “behavior to assume the form that maximizes inclusive fitness”(Irons 1979b, 33). Turke and Betzig (1985) state this hypothesis as a formal prediction: “Modern Darwinian theory predicts that human behavior will be adaptive, that is, designed to promote maximum reproductive success through available descendant and nondescendant relatives.”(p 79)… [T]he key terms in [this] quotation are used in DA to bypass the question of phenotypic design in characterizations of adaptation.(Symons 1989, 131-132)

Symons, along with Tooby and Cosmides, were amongst the founders of the emerging school of evolutionary psychology, whose aim has been to focus more on these hypothesized proximate psychological mechanisms.

== Theoretical background ==
Darwinian anthropology was critiqued by Symonds for its agnosticism as to the psychological mechanisms governing how social behavior is actually expressed in the human species, and its reliance on interpreting inclusive fitness theory to simply imply that humans have evolved to be inclusive fitness maximizers. This section will review some of the relevant background discussion in inclusive fitness theory to clarify why this position was considered untenable.

=== Evolutionary versus proximate explanations ===
Inclusive Fitness theory has often been interpreted to mean that social behavior per se is a goal of evolution, and also that genes (or individual organisms) are selected to find ways of actively distinguishing the identity of close genetic relatives ‘in order to’ engage in social behaviors with them.

[M]any misunderstandings persist. In many cases, they result from conflating “coefficient of relatedness” and “proportion of shared genes,” which is a short step from the intuitively appealing—but incorrect—interpretation that “animals tend to be altruistic toward those with whom they share a lot of genes.” These misunderstandings don't just crop up occasionally; they are repeated in many writings, including undergraduate psychology textbooks—most of them in the field of social psychology, within sections describing evolutionary approaches to altruism. (Park 2007, p860)

The apparent rationale for this common mis-interpretation is that organisms would thereby benefit the “Inclusive Fitness of the individuals (and genes) involved”. This approach overlooks the point that evolution is not a teleological process, but a passive, consequential and undirected biological process, where environmental variations and drift effects are present alongside random gene mutations and natural selection.

Inclusive fitness theory takes the form of an ultimate explanation, specifically a criterion (br>c), for the evolution of social behaviors, not a proximate mechanism governing the expression of social behaviors. What forms of social behavior might meet this criterion cannot be a priori specified by the theory, nor can it shed light on whether the life history of a species provides opportunities for social interactions to occur. Thus, strictly speaking, the interpretation that organisms ‘have evolved to’ direct social behavior towards genetic relatives is not implied by the theory (see also inclusive fitness).

Investigating how inclusive fitness theory might apply to the potential emergence of social traits in any given species must begin with an analysis of the evolutionarily typical ecological niche, demographics, and patterns of interaction of that species. Where significant interaction between individuals is not present in the life history of a species, the theory is necessarily null regarding social behaviors between individuals. As Silk (2001) put it;

The role of kinship in the daily lives of animals depends on the demographic composition of the groups in which they live. Kin selection will only be an important force in the evolution of social behavior if animals find themselves in situations where they have an opportunity to fulfill the predictions of Hamilton's rule. At a minimum, kin must be available. The number, availability, and degree of relatedness among kin will depend on how groups are constructed in nature.” (Silk 2001, 77)

Consideration must thus be given to whether the ecological niche leads to the clustering of individuals in groups or whether individuals are typically solitary. Socioecology research, for example, suggests that fundamental influences on demographic patterns are the distribution/fecundity of primary food sources as well as patterns of predation. When considering social behavior traits of a given species, consideration of these influences is in a sense, logically prior to analyses of inclusive fitness pressures on the species.

=== Selection pressure on genes or strategy of individuals ===
Darwinian anthropology, following R. D. Alexander, used the notion of the inclusive fitness of individuals rather than the inclusive fitness of genes. Dawkins (above) pointed to this as an error. The source of the confusion can be traced to discussions in Hamilton's early papers on inclusive fitness. In his 1963 paper Hamilton refers, unambiguously, to selection pressures on genes;

[T]he ultimate criterion which determines whether G [a gene] will spread is not whether the behaviour is to the benefit of the behaver but whether it is to the benefit of the gene G; and this will be the case if the average net result of the behaviour is to add to the gene pool a handful of genes containing G in higher concentration than does the gene pool itself.” (1996 [1963], 7)

However, in his paper published in 1964, actually written before the 1963 paper (Hamilton 1996), Hamilton had included a subsidiary discussion on what the genetic theory might imply for how we look at the fitness of individuals:

Actually, in the preceding mathematical account we were not concerned with the inclusive fitness of individuals as described here but rather with certain averages of them which we call the inclusive fitness of types. But the idea of the inclusive fitness of an individual is nevertheless a useful one. Just as in the sense of classical selection we may consider whether a given character expressed in an individual is adaptive in the sense of being in the interest of his personal fitness or not, so in the present sense of selection we may consider whether the character or trait of behaviour is or is not adaptive in the sense if being in the interest of his inclusive fitness.” (Hamilton 1996 [1964], 38)

It is clear here that the formal treatment is of the selection pressures on types (genes or traits), whilst the notion of individual inclusive fitness may serve as a guide to the adaptiveness of the trait; just as consideration of effects of a trait on an individual's fitness can be instructive when considering classical selection on traits. At the same time, it is understandable that Alexander took the inclusive fitness of individuals as a heuristic device.

=== Context-based or discrimination-based expression mechanisms ===
In his 1964 paper, Hamilton 'hazards' “the following unrigorous statement of the main principle that has emerged from the model”;

The Social behaviour of a species evolves in such a way that in each distinct behaviour-evoking situation the individual will seem to value his neighbours’ fitness against his own according to the coefficients of relationship appropriate to that situation.”(1964 [1996], 49)

He uses the terms 'hazards', 'unrigorous', and 'will seem' deliberately, since his formal analysis makes clear that the model specifies the evolutionary selection pressure, rather than specifying what mechanisms govern the proximate expression of social behaviors. He also clearly points to social behaviors being evoked in distinct situations, and that individuals may encounter potential social recipients of different degree of relationship in different situations. If one ignores the cautious qualifying words however, the passage might readily be interpreted to imply that individuals are indeed expected to make an active assessment of the degree of relatedness of others they interact with in different situations. Later in the paper, Hamilton again discusses the issue of whether the performance (or expression) of social behaviors might be conditional on; (a) discriminating factors which correlate with close relationship with the recipient, or (b) actually discriminating which individuals 'really are' in close relationship with the recipient:

The selective advantage which makes behaviour conditional in the right sense on the discrimination of factors which correlate with the relationship of the individual concerned is therefore obvious. It may be, for instance, that in respect of a certain social action performed towards neighbours indiscriminately, an individual is only just breaking even in terms of inclusive fitness. If he could learn to recognise those of his neighbours who really were close relatives and could devote his beneficial actions to them alone an advantage to inclusive fitness would at once appear. Thus a mutation causing such discriminatory behaviour itself benefits inclusive fitness and would be selected. In fact, the individual may not need to perform any discrimination so sophisticated as we suggest here; a difference in the generosity of his behaviour according to whether the situations evoking it were encountered near to, or far from, his own home might occasion an advantage of a similar kind.” (1996 [1964], 51)

For certain social behaviors, Hamilton suggests there may be selection pressure for more discerning discrimination of genetic relatedness, were the mutation to occur. But 'in fact' the same net result of accurately targeting social behaviors towards genetic relatives could be achieved via a simpler mechanism of being expressed in proximity to the actor's 'home'. Hamilton is thus agnostic as to whether evolved social behaviors might be expressed via straightforward proximate mechanisms such as location-based cues, or whether more specific discriminatory powers might govern their expression. He does suggest that the distinct social contexts within which various social behaviors are expressed are factors to consider. Other theorists have discussed these questions of whether proximity, context or more discriminatory expression may govern behaviors:

Animals cannot, of course, be expected to know, in a cognitive sense, who their relatives are, and in practice the behaviour that is favoured by natural selection will be equivalent to a rough rule of thumb such as ‘share food with anything that moves in the nest in which you are sitting.’ If families happen to go around in groups, this fact provides a useful rule of thumb for kin selection: ‘care for any individual you often see’.” (Dawkins 1979, 187)

If, for example, animals behave with an equal degree of altruism to all their “neighbours”… and if on average animals are related to their neighbours, then I would regard this as an example of kin selection. It is not a necessary feature of kin selection that an animal should distinguish different degrees of relationship among its neighbours, and behave with greater altruism to the more closely related…”(Maynard Smith 1976, 282 emphasis in original)

Dawkins believes social behaviors will in practice be governed by context-based expression. Maynard Smith is, like Hamilton, agnostic, but reiterates the point that context-based cues might well govern their expression and that actively distinguishing relatives is not necessarily expected for the expression of those social traits whose evolution is governed by inclusive fitness criteria. In sum, inclusive fitness theory does imply that; the evolutionary emergence of social behavior can occur where there is statistical association of genes between social actors and recipients; but that the expression of such evolved social behaviors is not necessarily governed by actual genetic relatedness between participants. The evolutionary criterion and the proximate mechanism must thus not be confused: the first does require genetic association (of the form br>c), the second does not.

Darwinian anthropology's central premise that human behavior has evolved to maximize the inclusive fitness of individuals is thus not a logical derivative of the theory. Also, the notion that humans will discriminate social behaviors towards genetic relatives is again not entailed by the theory.

== Reception by anthropologists ==
Before the questions raised within anthropology about the study of ‘kinship’ by Schneider and others from the 1960s onwards, anthropology itself had paid very little attention to the notion that social bonds were anything other than connected to consanguinal (or genetic) relatedness (or its local cultural conceptions). The social bonding associated with provision of and sharing of food was one important exception, particularly in the work of Richards, but this was largely ignored by descriptions of ‘kinship’ till more recently. Although questioning the means by which ‘kinship bonds’ form, few of these early accounts questioned the fundamental role of ‘procreative ties’ in social bonding (Schneider, 1984). From the 1950s onwards, reports on kinship patterns in the New Guinea Highlands added some momentum to what had until then been only occasional fleeting suggestions that living together (co-residence) might underlie social bonding, and eventually contributed to the general shift away from a genealogical approach. For example, on the basis of his observations, Barnes suggested:

[C]learly, genealogical connexion of some sort is one criterion for membership of many social groups. But it may not be the only criterion; birth, or residence, or a parent's former residence, or utilization of garden land, or participation in exchange and feasting activities or in house-building or raiding, may be other relevant criteria for group membership.”(Barnes 1962,6)

Similarly, Langness' ethnography of the Bena Bena also emphasized a break with the genealogical perspective:

The sheer fact of residence in a Bena Bena group can and does determine kinship. People do not necessarily reside where they do because they are kinsmen: rather they become kinsmen because they reside there.” (Langness 1964, 172 emphasis in original)

By 1972, Schneider had raised deep problems with the notion that human social bonds and 'kinship' was a natural category built upon genealogical ties (for more information, see kinship), and especially in the wake of his 1984 critique this has become broadly accepted by most, if not all, anthropologists.

The darwinian anthropology (and other sociobiological) perspectives, arising in the early 1970s, had not unreasonably assumed that the genealogical conceptions of human kinship, in place since Morgan's early work in the 1870s, were still valid as a universal feature of humans. But they emerged at precisely the time that anthropology, being particularly sensitive about its own apparent 'ethnocentric' generalizations about kinship (from cultural particulars to human universals) was seeking to distance itself from these conceptions. The vehemence of Sahlins' rebuttal of sociobiology's genetic relatedness perspective in his 1976 The use and abuse of Biology, which underlined the non-genealogical nature of human kinship, can be understood as part of this 'distancing' trend.

== Alternative approaches ==
The lack of success of darwinian anthropology created space for alternative approaches to analyzing human social behaviors from a biological perspective. Alexander's initial point (above) that the inclusive fitness framework had been scarcely applied to human kinship and social patterns has remained largely valid. But the move away from genealogical kinship in anthropology has continued to be a major barrier to any potential resolution. This section reviews a range of approaches to synthesizing ideas from evolutionary biology to observations and data about human social behaviour across contemporary human populations. Whilst some of these approaches include the inclusive fitness approach, others may seek to demonstrate fit to other theories from evolutionary biology, or to demonstrate that certain proximate mechanisms of social behaviour are both compatible with the inclusive fitness approach, and also with the broad variety of ethnographic data on human kinship patterns.

== Criticism ==
Theories in evolutionary biology relevant to understanding social behavior may not be limited to frameworks such as inclusive fitness theory. The theory of reciprocal altruism may have equal or greater explanatory power for some forms of human social behavior, and perhaps kinship patterns. Other approaches may maintain that human behavior is less amenable to biological analysis due to the prominent influence of social learning and cultural transmission in the human species, and instead advance ideas based on the role of e.g. culture, historical contingencies or economic/environmental conditions. All or any of these may or may not contribute valuable insights to our understanding of social behavior and social patterns in humans.

== See also ==
- Kinship
- Anthropology
- Nurture kinship
- Avunculate
- Inclusive fitness
- Kin selection
- Evolutionary psychology
- Human behavioral ecology
- Selfish gene theory
