= Mark Flinn =

American anthropologist

Mark V. Flinn is a biomedical anthropologist, specializing in childhood stress, family relationships and health. His research includes a longitudinal 35-year study of child health in a rural community on the Caribbean island of Dominica. This study is the first of its kind to monitor stress hormones in a naturalistic setting.

== Career ==
In 2012, Flinn was elected as a lifetime Fellow of the American Association for the Advancement of Science and the Association for Psychological Science. Between 2013 and 2015, he was president of the Human Behavior and Evolution Society.
