= Center for Evolutionary Psychology =

Research center

Coordinates: 34.4119°N 119.8450°W

Center for Evolutionary Psychology (CEP) is a research center co-founded and co-directed by John Tooby and Leda Cosmides and is affiliated with the University of California, Santa Barbara.

The center is meant to provide research support and comprehensive training in the field of evolutionary psychology. The goals of the center are to facilitate the discovery of the adaptations that characterize the species-wide architecture of the human mind and brain and to explore how socio-cultural phenomena can be explained with reference to these adaptations.

The extramural board of the center are made up of Irven DeVore, Paul Ekman, Michael Gazzaniga, Steven Pinker and Roger Shepard.

== See also ==
- Leda Cosmides
- Evolutionary psychology
- John Tooby
