= Psychological adaptation =

Psychological theory

A psychological adaptation is a functional, cognitive or behavioral trait that benefits an organism in its environment. Psychological adaptations fall under the scope of evolved psychological mechanisms (EPMs), however, EPMs refer to a less restricted set. Psychological adaptations include only the functional traits that increase the fitness of an organism, while EPMs refer to any psychological mechanism that developed through the processes of evolution. These additional EPMs are the by-product traits of a species’ evolutionary development (see spandrels), as well as the vestigial traits that no longer benefit the species’ fitness. It can be difficult to tell whether a trait is vestigial or not, so some literature is more lenient and refers to vestigial traits as adaptations, even though they may no longer have adaptive functionality. For example, xenophobic attitudes and behaviors, some have claimed, appear to have certain EPM influences relating to disease aversion, however, in many environments these behaviors will have a detrimental effect on a person's fitness. The principles of psychological adaptation rely on Darwin's theory of evolution and are important to the fields of evolutionary psychology, biology, and cognitive science.

== Darwinian theory ==
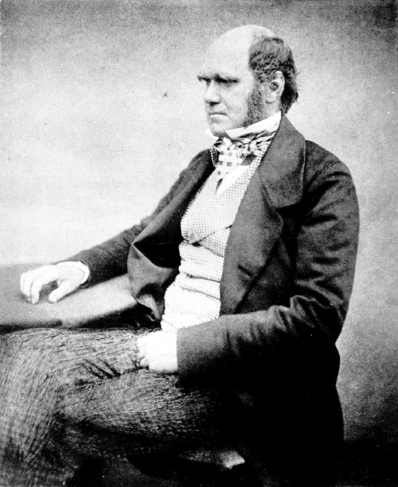
Charles Darwin

Charles Darwin proposed his theory of evolution in On the Origin of Species (1859). His theory dictates that adaptations are traits that arise from the selective pressures a species faces in its environment. Adaptations must benefit either an organism's chance of survival or reproduction to be considered adaptive, and are then passed down to the next generation through this process of natural selection. Psychological adaptations are those adaptive traits that we consider cognitive or behavioral. These can include conscious social strategies, subconscious emotional responses (guilt, fear, etc.), or the most innate instincts. Evolutionary psychologists consider a number of factors in what determines a psychological adaptation, such as functionality, complexity, efficiency, and universality. The Adapted Mind is considered a foundational text on evolutionary psychology, further integrating Darwinian theory into modern psychology.

== Evolved adaptation vs learned behaviour ==
An area of disagreement arises between evolutionary psychologists, cognitive scientists and behaviourists on where to draw the line on what is considered a psychological adaptation, and what is considered a learned behaviour. Where behaviourism explains certain behaviours as conditioned responses, cognitivism may push that these behaviours arise from a psychological adaptation that institutes a preference for that behaviour. Evolutionary psychology proposes that the human psychology consists primarily of psychological adaptations, which is opposed by the tabula rasa or blank slate model of human psychology. Early behaviourists, like B.F. Skinner, tended to the blank slate model and argued that innate behaviors and instincts were few, some behaviourists suggesting that the only innate behavior was the ability to learn. On the other hand, Steven Pinker presents the cognitivist perspective in his book, The Blank Slate, in which he challenges the tabula rasa models and argues that human behaviour is shaped by psychological adaptations.

This difference in theory can be seen in research on modern human sexual preferences, with behaviourists arguing that attraction has conditioning influences, such as from the media or cultural norms, while others arguing it is based on psychological adaptations. However, sexual preferences are a difficult subject to test due to the amount of variance and flexibility exhibited in human mate choice. A hybrid resolution to psychological adaptations and learned behaviours refers to an adaptation as the species’ capacity for a certain behavior, while each individual organism still needs to be conditioned to exhibit that behaviour. This approach can explain language acquisition in relation to linguist and cognitive scientist Noam Chomsky's model of human language. His model supports that the capacity for language is a psychological adaptation (involving both the language necessary brain structures and disposition for language acquisition), however, children lack any particular instantiation of language at birth, and must instead learn one in their environment.

== Sexual selection ==
The mating strategies of both sexes can be simplified into different psychological adaptations. There is extensive evidence that incest avoidance, which is the tendency to avoid sexual intercourse with close relatives is an evolved behavioural adaptation. Incest avoidance can be seen cross-culturally in humans, and is evident in wild animals. Evolutionary psychologists argue that incest avoidance adapted due to the greater chance of producing children with severe disabilities when mating with relatives, and because genetic variability offers an increase in fitness regarding offspring survival. Sexual jealousy is another behavior observed in human and non-human animals that appears to be instinctual. Heuristic problem solving and consistent preference for behavioral patterns are considered by some evolutionary psychologists to be psychological adaptations. For example, the tendency for females to change their sexual strategies when faced with developmental pressures such as an absent father may be the result of a psychological adaptation.

== Psychological adaptation in males ==
Human males may have developed psychological adaptations, which could influence reported patterns in intersexual (appearing attractive to the opposite sex) and intrasexual (restricting competitors of the same-sex) mating "strategies" in ways that increase their reproductive success. Examples of possible adaptations include behaviors that advertise mate quality, retention tactics, and short/long-term mating preferences.

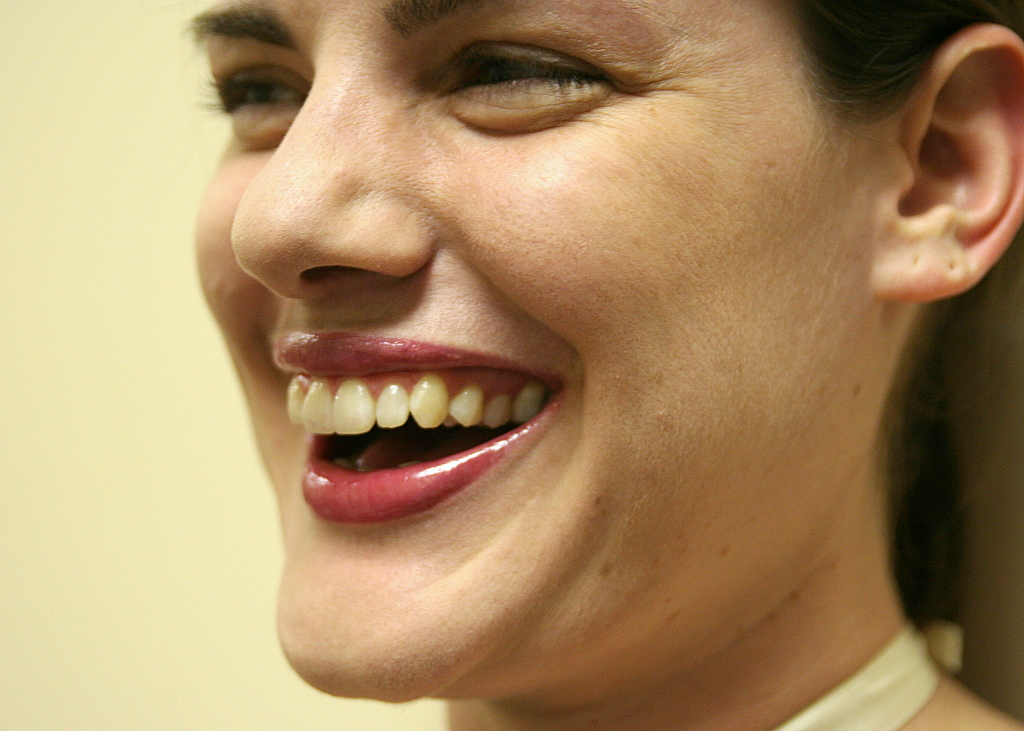
Women find humorous men more attractive.

=== Humour ===
It has been researched that humour is sexually selected and acts as a fitness indicator. According to this research it was theorized that the production of humour increases "mate value" in men, and some women seek men with a good sense of humour. In turn, some men are believed to have developed an adaptation in which they endeavour to produce humour with the aim to attract female mates.

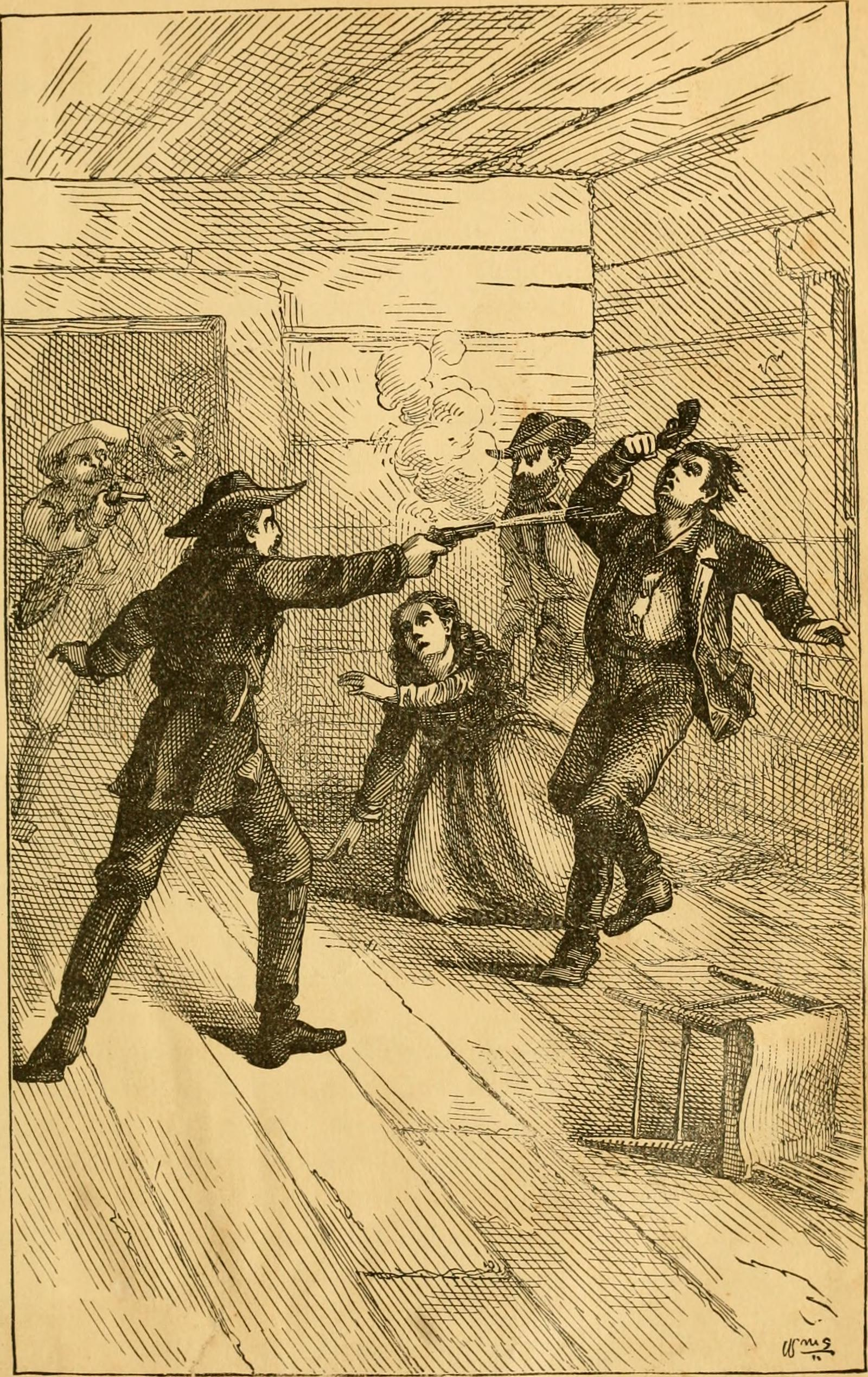
Historically, men fight with each other as a mate retention strategy.

=== Mate preferences ===
Though significant cultural variability exists in both male and female mate preferences, evolutionary psychologists predict that preferences in males could have adaptive explanations, as indicated by correlative studies on female attractiveness and cues of reproductive value, such as a waist–hip ratio. Women with a waist-to-hip ratio of 0.7 are, in some samples, considered more attractive on average to males than those with ratios above or below.

=== Mate retention ===
Males could have developed behaviours that aid mate retention, also known as mate guarding, in order to increase reproductive success in long-term relationships. Observations of possible male mate retention behaviors include intrasexual and intersexual strategies, such as derogating rival males. When considering the influence of non-evolutionary (e.g., cultural/economic) factors, males in some environments have been observed restricting mate interactions with other men and/or using coercion/violence to control mates. Intrasexual strategies that have also been observed and are potentially adaptive include public displays of mate possession or intimidation tactics that discourage rival communication with said mate.

=== Long-term mating ===
In regards to parental investment, some hypotheses posit that, when compared to short-term mating, males display risk-averse mate-choice behaviors in long-term (committed) relationships, as investing in offspring is energetically and emotionally costly and involves inherent risks considering the issue of "paternity uncertainty". Therefore, as an adaptation, males investment patterns and any potential genes underlying them could be partially understood by trade-offs in ancestral conditions.

=== Short-term mating ===
Male short-term mating is reportedly more common than females in cross-cultural analyses, with both historical (non-genetic) and evolutionary explanations providing insight into the origin(s) of this difference. Evolutionary explanations utilize frameworks based on minimum female parental investment (nine months of gestation), in which conception inherently poses a higher investment potential without the use of birth control methods. Additionally, preferences for sexual variety and novelty are typically higher in males, a finding that some scholars use as support for adaptive explanations of these behavioral patterns. Furthermore, males are consistently higher in risk-taking and motivation when provided opportunity for sexual experiences with lower levels of commitment and familiarity, as is illustrated in several studies that found male participants more likely than women to have sexual intercourse with someone having known them for only one hour, one day, one week, or one month.

== Psychological adaptation in females ==
Human female sexually-differentiated mating tendencies provide possible evidence of adaptations that, ancestrally, may have increased fitness and reproductive success. For example, mate choice, threat aversion tactics and pregnancy sickness are all hypothesized to be female-specific psychological adaptations, identified through empirical research, and are predicted to have increased genetic contributions through survival and reproduction.

=== Mate-choice as an adaptation ===
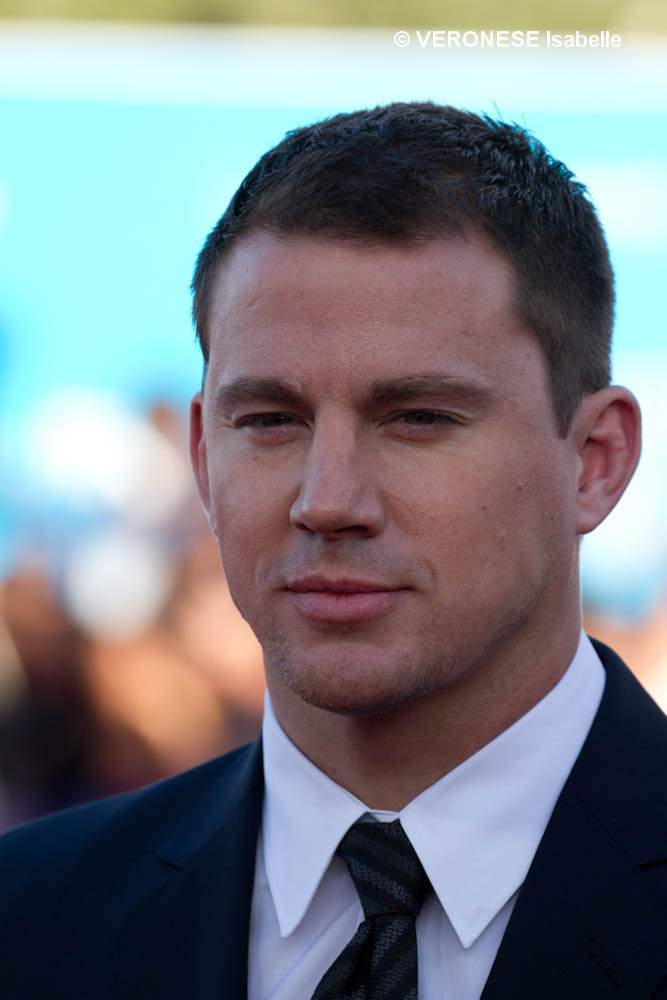
Women can use facial cues such as strong jawlines to detect testosterone presence.

An example of possible psychological adaptations for the purpose of reproductive success can be seen in female mate choice. David Buss, an evolutionary psychologist, examines the fundamental principles of selection pressures that create human mate preferences in his contribution to the publication The Adapted Mind. Female psychological adaptations could have potential underpinnings that influence mate preferences in certain male physical/psychological attributes and behaviours. Robert Trivers, an evolutionary biologist, outlines the evolutionary basis of these preferences in relation to parental investment and sexual selection. He proposes that females have adapted a preference to mate with males who display both an ability and willingness to invest vital resources for the survival of the female and her offspring. Research suggests females are able to use external cues displayed by males such as territory, physical characteristics (e.g., stature) or existing/potential resources.

For example, women may have the ability to pick up on the long-term presence of testosterone in men by observing facial testosterone cues. Testosterone stimulates craniofacial development and results in a squarer jaw and consequently, a more masculine appearance. While evidence is mixed and/or contradictory, some studies indicate that, in the fertile phase of their menstrual cycle, women may perceive masculine faces as healthier and more attractive than feminine male faces. Females may also show a psychological adaptation to detect mate quality using these hormonal cues which display the male's fitness and reproductive value. These male cues of testosterone could provide evidence of the ability to offset the high physiological costs such as immunosuppressant effects.

=== Rape avoidance ===
Several researchers have proposed that self-protective psychological tendencies found in women have adaptive function in motivating rape-avoidance behaviours or strategies. This is because rape poses severe costs for the female such as pregnancy, physical harm, injury or death, relationship abandonment and self-esteem depletion. The greatest cost to the female is the circumvention of her mate choice, which threatens reproductive success, resulting in the possession of adaptations in response. Proponents of this hypothesis suggest that a number of female-specific traits have evolved in order to reduce the risks associated with experiencing rape or other dangerous situations. The body-guard hypothesis proposes that rape-avoidance could be related to female preferences for physically strong or protective males. Women may also form groups with both sexes as a protective alliance against potential threats. Negative psychological effects following assault—in addition to being a natural byproduct of victimization—could also be seen as adaptive in its ability to signal distress to others in the tribe (potentially leading to exclusion or death of perpetrator) and increase vigilance and other self-protective measures in the future.

Potentially related findings include those that show reproductive-aged women are found to experience increased levels of psychological discomfort following sexual assault. Research also suggests that women in the fertile phase of their menstrual cycle are more risk-averse. Women's upper-body strength also changes relative to their menstrual cycle;in the fertile phase studies show an increase in handgrip strength when placed in a threatening, sexually coercive scenario. Susceptibility to signs of a male coerciveness is also identified to be higher in fertile women.

=== Pregnancy sickness ===
One psychological adaptation found solely in women is pregnancy sickness. This is an adaptation resulting from natural selection for the purpose of avoiding toxic-containing foods during pregnancy. Margaret Profet, an evolutionary biologist, provides evidence for this adaptation in a literature review on pregnancy sickness. Particular plant foods, whilst unharmful to adults, can contain toxins (e.g. teratogens) that are dangerous for developing embryos and can potentially cause birth defects such as facial asymmetry. Evidence lies in the finding that women who experience more extreme cases of pregnancy sickness tend to be less likely to miscarry or have babies with birth defects. This fits the criteria for an adaptation as it enhances fitness and increases reproductive success – it results in greater fertility of the mother and contributes to the health of the developing embryo.

Researchers dispute whether this is actually a psychological adaptation. From the perspective of some evolutionary psychologists, however, evidence suggests at least partial explanation of these behaviors in selective pressures in early ancestral environments. For example, the toxins are found only in natural wild plant foods, not processed foods in our modern-day environment. Furthermore, pregnant women experiencing sickness have been found to avoid particular bitter or pungent smelling foods, potentially containing toxins. Pregnancy induced sickness only typically occurs 3 weeks after conception, around the time when the embryo has started forming major organs and is therefore at the highest risk.

== See also ==
- Adaptive behavior (ecology)
- Adaptive bias
- Adjustment (psychology)
- Cognitive module
- Dual inheritance theory
- Evolutionary developmental psychology
- Evolutionary psychology
- Human behavioral ecology
- Instinct
- Modularity of mind
