= Davide Rodogno =

Swiss-Italian historian

Davide Rodogno is a Swiss and Italian historian of humanitarianism, human rights and international organisations since the nineteenth century. He also writes on authoritarian and totalitarian regimes.

Rodogno is a professor of international history at the Graduate Institute of International and Development Studies, in Geneva, Switzerland. He was previously an RCUK Academic Fellow at the University of St Andrews and a research fellow at the London School of Economics.

In 2005, he received the Italian literary award, Feudo Di Maida Prize (in full, Premio Letterario Internazionale Feudo Di Maida), for his book Il nuovo ordine mediterraneo (published by Bollati Boringhieri, Turin). The book, a history of Italy's fascist imperial ambitions in the 1940s, was re-published by Cambridge University Press under the title Fascism’s European Empire (Cambridge University Press, 2006). It has been described as an "illuminating appraisal of Fascist Italy's ambitions" and "pioneering".

Rodogno holds a PhD from the Graduate Institute of International and Development Studies and University of Geneva.

== Publications ==
Representative publications include:

- Night on Earth – Humanitarian Organizations’ Relief and Rehabilitation Programmes on Behalf of Civilian Populations (1918–1939) (Cambridge University Press, 2021)
- Humanitarian Photography: A History (Cambridge University Press, 2015)
- Against Massacre: Humanitarian Interventions in the Ottoman Empire (1815–1914) (Princeton University Press, 2011)
- Fascism’s European Empire (Cambridge University Press, 2006)

== Interviews ==
- With the Lausanne Project, episode 41: "Reading the clouds"
