= Evolutionary educational psychology =

Field of study

Evolutionary educational psychology is the study of the relation between inherent folk knowledge and abilities and accompanying inferential and attributional biases as these influence academic learning in evolutionarily novel cultural contexts, such as schools and the industrial workplace. The fundamental premises and principles of this discipline are presented below.

== Premises ==
The premises of evolutionary educational psychology state there are:

- (a) aspects of mind and brain that have evolved to draw the individuals attention to and facilitate the processing of social (folk psychology), biological (folk biology), physical (folk physics) information patterns that facilitated survival or reproductive outcomes during human evolution (Cosmides & Tooby, 1994; Geary, 2005; Gelman, 1990; Pinker, 1997; Shepard, 1994; Simon, 1956);
- (b) although plastic to some degree, these primary abilities are inherently constrained to the extent associated information patterns tended to be consistent across generations and within lifetimes (e.g., Caramazza & Shelton, 1998; Geary & Huffman, 2002);
- (c) other aspects of mind and brain evolved to enable the mental generation of potential future social, ecological, or climatic conditions and enable rehearsal of behaviors to cope with variation in these conditions, and are now known as general fluid intelligence, or gF (including skill at everyday reasoning/problem solving; Chiappe & MacDonald, 2005; Geary, 2005; Mithen, 1996); and
- (d) children are inherently motivated to learn in folk domains, with the associated attentional and behavioral biases resulting in experiences that automatically and implicitly flesh out and adapt these systems to local conditions (Gelman, 1990; Gelman & Williams, 1998; Gelman, 2003).

== Principles ==
The principles of evolutionary educational psychology represent the foundational assumptions for an evolutionary educational psychology. The gist is knowledge and expertise that is useful in the cultural milieu or ecology in which the group is situated will be transferred across generations in the form of cultural artifacts, such as books, or learning traditions, as in apprenticeships (e.g., Baumeister, 2005; Richerson & Boyd, 2005; Flinn, 1997; Mithen, 1996). Across generations, the store of cultural knowledge accumulates and creates a gap between this knowledge base and the forms of folk knowledge and abilities that epigenetically emerge with children's self-initiated activities.

There must of course be an evolved potential to learn evolutionarily novel information and an associated bias to seek novelty during the developmental period and indeed throughout the life span; this may be related to the openness to experience dimension of personality (Geary, 1995, 2002, in press).

However, the cross-generational accumulation of knowledge across cultures, individuals, and domains (e.g., people vs. physics) has resulted in an exponential increase in the quantity of secondary knowledge available in modern societies today. For most people, the breadth and complexity of this knowledge will very likely exceed any biases to learn in evolutionary novel domains.

== Creation vs. the learning of knowledge ==
A related issue concerns the traits that enable the creation of biologically secondary knowledge and thus culture and the extent to which these traits overlap with the ability to learn knowledge created by others.

Stated differently, Is the goal of education to have children recreate the process of discovery, to learn the products of discovery, or some combination? Some educators have advocated a focus on the process of discovery without full consideration of the constellation of traits and opportunity that contribute to the creation of secondary knowledge (e.g., Cobb, Yackel, & Wood, 1992). In fact, research on creative-productive individuals suggests that the full constellation of traits that facilitate the discovery and creation of secondary knowledge is rare and not likely reproducible on a large scale (Simonton, 1999a, 1999b, 2003; Sternberg, 1999; Wai, Lubinski, & Benbow, 2005).

== Summary ==
=== Premises ===
- 1.) Natural selection has resulted in an evolved motivational disposition to attempt to gain access to and control of the resources that have covaried with survival and reproductive outcomes during human evolution.
- 2.) These resources fall into three broad categories: social, biological, and physical which correspond to the respective domains of folk psychology, folk biology, and folk physics.
- 3.) Attentional, perceptual, and cognitive systems, including inferential and attributional biases, have evolved to process information in these folk domains and to guide control-related behavioral strategies. These systems process restricted classes of information associated with these folk domains.
- 4.) To cope with variation in social, ecological, or climatic conditions, systems that enabled the mental generation of these potential future conditions and enabled rehearsals of behaviors to cope with this variation evolved and the supporting attentional and cognitive mechanisms are known as general fluid intelligence and everyday reasoning.
- 5.) Children are biologically biased to engage in activities that recreate the ecologies of human evolution; these are manifested as social play, and exploration of the environment and objects. The accompanying experiences interact with the inherent but skeletal folk systems and flesh out these systems such that they are adapted to the local social group and ecology.

=== Principles ===
- 1.) Scientific, technological, and academic advances initially emerged from the cognitive and motivational systems that support folk psychology, folk biology, and folk physics. Innovations that enabled better control of ecologies or social dynamics or resulted in a coherent (though not necessarily scientifically accurate) understanding of these dynamics are likely to be retained across generations as cultural artifacts (e.g., books) and traditions (e.g. apprenticeships). These advances result in an ever growing gap between folk knowledge and the theories and knowledge base of the associated sciences and other disciplines (e.g., literature).
- 2.) Schools emerge in societies in which scientific, technological, and intellectual advances result in a gap between folk knowledge and the competencies needed for living in the society.
- 3.) The function of schools is to organize the activities of children such that they acquire the biologically secondary competencies that close the gap between folk knowledge and the occupational and social demands of the society.
- 4.) Biologically secondary competencies are built from primary folk systems and the components of fluid intelligence that evolved to enable individuals to cope with variation and novelty.
- 5.) Children's inherent motivational bias to engage in activities that will adapt folk knowledge to local conditions will often conflict with the need to engage in activities that will result in secondary learning.
- 6.) The need for explicit instruction will be a direct function of the degree to which the secondary competency differs from the supporting primary systems.

== See also ==
- Dual inheritance theory
- Educational psychology
- Evolutionary developmental psychology
- Evolutionary psychology
- Human behavioral ecology
- Wikibook about educational psychology
