= David Perrett =

British psychologist (born 1954)

Professor David Perrett FBA FRSE

Professor of Psychology, University of St Andrews

Personal details
- Born: David Ian Perrett; 11 April 1954 (age 72)
- Occupation: Psychologist

David Ian Perrett (born 11 April 1954) is a professor of psychology at the University of St Andrews in Scotland, where he leads the Perception Lab. The main focus in his team's research is on face perception, including facial cues to health, effects of physiological conditions on facial appearance, and facial preferences in social settings such as trust games and mate choice. He has published over 400 peer-reviewed articles, many of which appearing in leading scientific journals such as the Proceedings of the Royal Society of London Series B—Biological Sciences, Psychological Science, and Nature.

Perrett received the British Psychological Society President's Award for Distinguished Contributions to Psychological Knowledge in 2000, the Golden Brain Award of Minerva Foundation in 2002, the Experimental Psychology Society Mid-Career prize (2008), and a British Academy Wolfson Research Professorship (2009–2012).

Perrett received a BSc in psychology from the University of St Andrews in 1976. Perrett received a DPhil in psychology from Oxford University in 1981, under Edmund Rolls.

== Works ==
- Perrett, David (2010). In Your Face. The New Science of Human Attraction. Basingstoke: Palgrave Macmillan. ISBN 978-0-230-20129-3.
