= Donald Symons =

American anthropologist (1942-2024)

- Occupation: Anthropologist
- Known for: One of the founders of evolutionary psychology Pioneering the study of human sexuality
- Scientific career
- Institutions: University of California, Santa Barbara

Donald Symons (1942–2024) was an American anthropologist best known as one of the founders of evolutionary psychology, and for pioneering the study of human sexuality from an evolutionary perspective. He is one of the most cited researchers in contemporary sex research. His work is referenced by scientists investigating an extremely diverse range of sexual phenomena. Harvard psychologist Steven Pinker described Symons' The Evolution of Human Sexuality (1979) as a "groundbreaking book" and "a landmark in its synthesis of evolutionary biology, anthropology, physiology, psychology, fiction, and cultural analysis, written with a combination of rigor and wit. It was a model for all subsequent books that apply evolution to human affairs, particularly mine." Symons was Professor Emeritus in the Department of Anthropology at the University of California, Santa Barbara. His last work, written with Catherine Salmon, was Warrior Lovers, an evolutionary analysis of slash fiction.

== Selected publications ==
- Symons, D. (1978) Play and Aggression: A Study of Rhesus Monkeys. Columbia University Press
- Symons, D. (1979) The Evolution of Human Sexuality. New York: Oxford University Press. ISBN 0-19-502907-0
- Symons, D. (1987) "If we're all Darwinians, what's the fuss about?" in Crawford, Smith & Krebs, Sociobiology and Psychology, 121–146.
- Symons, D. (1989) "A critique of Darwinian anthropology," in Ethology and Sociobiology, 10: 131–144.
- Symons, D. (1990) "Adaptiveness and adaptation," in Ethology and Sociobiology, 11: 427–444.
- Symons, D. (1992) "On the use and misuse of Darwinism in the study of human behavior" in Barkow, J., Cosmides, L. & Tooby, J. (eds) (1992) The Adapted Mind: Evolutionary psychology and the generation of culture (New York: Oxford University Press)
- Symons, D. (1993) "The stuff that dreams aren't made of: Why wake-state and dream-state sensory experiences differ." Cognition, 47: 181–217.
- Symons, D. (1995) "Beauty is in the adaptations of the beholder: The evolutionary psychology of human female sexual attractiveness" pp. 80–120 in Abramson, P.R. and Pinkerton, S.D. (eds.) Sexual Nature/Sexual Culture, The University of Chicago Press.
- Salmon, C. and Symons, D. (2003) Warrior Lovers. Yale University Press.
