= Evolutionary psychology research groups and centers =

The following is a list of evolutionary psychology research groups and centers.

Country	Group	Institution
Argentina	Group on Evolutionary Archaeology and Anthropology	University of Buenos Aires
Canada	Human Evolutionary Studies Program	Simon Fraser University
Canada	Behavioural Ecology Research Group	Simon Fraser University
Canada	Centre for Human Evolution, Cognition and Culture	University of British Columbia & Simon Fraser University
Germany	Ludwig-Boltzmann-Institute for Urban Ethology(discontinued)	Ludwig-Boltzmann-Institute
Germany	Center for Adaptive Behavior and Cognition (discontinued)	Max Planck Institute
Germany	Max Planck Institute for Human Cognitive and Brain Science	Max Planck Institute
Germany	Department of Biological Personality Psychology	Georg August University Göttingen
Netherlands	Evolutionary Social and Organisational Psychology Research	VU University
Norway	Evolutionary Psychology and Individual Differences	Norwegian University of Science and Technology
UK	Centre for Economic Learning and Social Evolution	University College London
UK	Human Evolutionary Ecology Group	University College London
UK	Origins of Mind Research Group	University of St Andrews
UK	Evolutionary Anthropology Research Group	Durham University
UK	Evolutionary Psychology and Behavior Ecology Group	University of Liverpool
UK	Centre for Comparative and Evolutionary Psychology	University of Portsmouth
UK	Centre for Culture and Evolution	Brunel University
UK	Centre for Research in Evolutionary Anthropology	Roehampton University
UK	Evolution and Social Interaction Research Group	Nottingham Trent University
USA	Ethology and Evolutionary Psychology Program	University of Arizona
USA	Behavioral Biology Laboratory	University of Chicago
USA	Biological Anthropology Program	University of California, Los Angeles
USA	UCLA Center for Behavior, Evolution, and Culture	University of California, Los Angeles
USA	The UCSB Center for Evolutionary Psychology	University of California, Santa Barbara
USA	Evolution and the Social Mind	University of California, Santa Barbara
USA	The Oklahoma Center for Evolutionary Analysis (OCEAN)	Oklahoma State University
USA	Center for Cognitive Archaeology	University of Colorado, Colorado Springs
USA	Evolutionary Psychology Lab	Oakland University
USA	Program for Evolutionary Dynamics	Harvard University
USA	Evolution and Human Behavior Laboratory	University of Miami
USA	Evolution and Human Adaptation Program	University of Michigan
USA	Nebraska Behavioral Biology Group	University of Nebraska–Lincoln
USA	NECSI	New England Complex Systems Institute
USA	Program in Evolution and Development	University of New Mexico
USA	Research Group on Evolution and Higher Cognition	Rutgers University
USA	Individual Differences and Evolutionary Psychology Program	University of Texas at Austin
USA	Evolutionary World Politics, Department of Political Science	University of Washington
USA	IGERT Program in Evolutionary Modeling	University of Washington & Washington State University
Hungary	Evolutionary Psychology Research Group of Pécs (EPRGP)	University of Pécs
Various	International Paleopsychology Project	International Paleopsychology Project
France	Evolution and Social Cognition Lab	Ecole Normale Supérieure de Paris
