= Standard social science model =

Alleged model of social science thought

The term standard social science model (SSSM) was introduced by John Tooby and Leda Cosmides in the 1992 edited volume The Adapted Mind. They used SSSM as a reference to social science philosophies related to the blank slate, relativism, social constructionism, and cultural determinism. They argue that those philosophies, capsulized within SSSM, formed the dominant theoretical paradigm in the development of the social sciences during the 20th century. According to their proposed SSSM paradigm, the mind is a general-purpose cognitive device shaped almost entirely by culture.

After establishing SSSM, Tooby and Cosmides make a case for replacing SSSM with the integrated model (IM), also known as the integrated causal model (ICM), which melds cultural and biological theories for the development of the mind. Supporters of SSSM include those who feel the term was conceived as a point of argument in support of ICM specifically and evolutionary psychology (EP) in general. There are criticisms that the allegation of SSSM is based on a straw man or rhetorical technique.

== Alleged proponents ==
Steven Pinker names several prominent social scientists as proponents of the standard social science model, including John B. Watson, Margaret Mead, Franz Boas, B. F. Skinner, Richard Lewontin, John Money, and Stephen Jay Gould.

== Alternative theoretical paradigm: the integrated model ==
The authors of The Adapted Mind have argued that the SSSM is now out of date and that a progressive model for the social sciences requires evolutionarily-informed models of nature-nurture interactionism, grounded in the computational theory of mind. Tooby and Cosmides refer to this new model as the integrated model (IM).

Tooby and Cosmides provide several comparisons between the SSSM and the IM, including the following:

Standard Social Science Model	Integrated Model
Humans are born as a blank slate.	Humans are born with a bundle of emotional, motivational and cognitive adaptations.
The brain is a "general-purpose" computer.	The brain is a collection of modular, domain-specific processors.
Culture/socialization programs behavior.	Behavior is the result of interactions between evolved psychological mechanisms and cultural and environmental influences.
Culture is free to vary any trait in any direction.	Culture itself is based on a universal human nature and is constrained by it.
Biology is relatively unimportant in understanding behavior.	An analysis of interactions between nature and nurture is important in understanding behavior.

== Criticism of the coining of the term ==
Richardson (2007) argues that, as proponents of evolutionary psychology (EP), evolutionary psychologists developed the SSSM as a rhetorical technique: "The basic move is evident in Cosmides and Tooby's most aggressive brief for evolutionary psychology. They want us to accept a dichotomy between what they call the "Standard Social Science Model" (SSSM) and the "Integrated Causal Model" (ICM) they favor ... it offers a false dichotomy between a manifestly untenable view and their own."

Wallace (2010) has also suggested the SSSM to be a false dichotomy and claims that "scientists in the EP tradition wildly overstate the influence and longevity of what they call the Standard Social Science Model (essentially, behaviorism) of human cognition".

Geoffrey Sampson argues that the SSSM is based on a straw man. He views Pinker's claim that the SSSM has been the dominant theoretical paradigm in the social sciences since the 1920s as "completely untenable". In his argument, Sampson cites British education policies in the 20th century that were guided by social scientists and which were based on the belief that children had in-built talents and needs. Thus, he challenges Pinker's assertion that the view of the mind among all social scientists is a tabula rasa. Moreover, Sampson only conditionally agrees that the scientists Pinker associates with the SSSM, such as Skinner, Watson, and Mead, were influential, stating, "to identify them as responsible for the general tone of intellectual life for eighty years seems comical". Similarly, Neil Levy appears to concur with Sampson's straw man thesis regarding the conception of the SSSM, against which evolutionary psychologists direct much of their criticism. Levy writes: "No-one—not even Skinner and his followers—has ever believed in the blank slate of Pinker's title."

Hilary Rose has criticized Tooby and Cosmides' arbitrary exclusion of economics and political science from their SSSM model, which Rose argues is "rather like excluding physiology and biochemistry from an account of the life sciences". She also states that Tooby and Cosmides have publicly indicted sociologists and anthropologists of inappropriate separatist behavior towards other academic disciplines while ignoring their newer efforts that demonstrate the complete opposite. Rose notes how sociologists and anthropologists have many new developments that involve study of the natural sciences and technology. Furthermore, Rose suggests that Tooby and Cosmides' characterization of scientists like Gould, Lewontin, Steven Rose and Leon Kamin as SSSM adherents is based on an inaccurate reading of works like The Mismeasure of Man and Not in Our Genes, two books that have explored the interplay between biology and the environment.

Simon Hampton (2004) contends that evolutionary psychologists' account of the SSSM misses the debate on the existence of psychological instincts in the early part of the 20th century. He argues:

psychological and behavioural thinkers have for long periods been immersed in the implications of Darwinism. It is plainly and factually incorrect for evolutionary psychology to deny this. And it is disingenuous to down-play it. Evolutionary psychologists who use the term "Standard Social Science Model" and rhetorical equivalents such as "the neo-behaviourist tradition" ... and "the tabula rasa view" ... undermine their own much-vaunted rigor.
