= Bill Irons =

American anthropologist

William Irons is an American evolutionary anthropologist and professor emeritus in anthropology at the Northwestern University known for his research on the Yomut Turkmen, in northern Iran. His research interests include evolutionary ecology, reproductive strategies, demography and the evolutionary foundations of morality and religion.

Together with Napoleon Chagnon he organized a set of symposia for the 1976 annual meeting of the American Anthropological Association exploring the use of behavioral ecology in anthropology. In 1979 this led to the publication of a volume edited by Chagnon and Irons entitled Evolutionary Biology and Human Social Behavior: An Anthropological Perspective encompassing much of the earliest work in anthropology designed to evaluate evolutionary theories of human behavior. Irons, Chagnon and Lee Cronk also co-edited the volume Adaptation and Human Behavior: An Anthropological Perspective

== Awards and honors ==
- President of the Evolutionary Anthropology Society, a Section of the American Anthropological Association (2004 – 2005)
- President of the Human Behavior and Evolution Society, 2001–3.
- Fellow of the American Association for the Advancement of Science (elected 1980).
- Lifetime Achievement Award for the Study of Pastoral Nomads from the Commission on Nomadic Peoples, International Union of Anthropological and Ethnological Sciences, 2000.
- Human Behavior and Evolution Society: Lifetime Career Award, 2011.
