= Jerome H. Barkow =

Canadian anthropologist (1944-2024

- Born: January 18, 1944; Brooklyn, New York, U.S.
- Died: April 30, 2024 (aged 80); Halifax, Nova Scotia, Canada
- Known for: Evolutionary psychology

Jerome H. Barkow (January 18, 1944 – April 30, 2024) was a Canadian anthropologist who was an early pioneer in the field of evolutionary psychology. He was most recently a professor emeritus at Dalhousie University.

== Biography ==
Barkow received a BA in Psychology from Brooklyn College in 1964 and a PhD in Human Development from the University of Chicago in 1970. Formerly a professor of Social Anthropology at Dalhousie University, he retired as professor emeritus in 2008, and was an honorary professor at Queen's University Belfast (Northern Ireland) from 2010 to 2017.

Barkow published on topics ranging from sex workers in Nigeria to the kinds of sentients SETI might find. He is best known as the author of Darwin, Sex, and Status: Biological Approaches to Mind and Culture (1989). In 1992, together with Leda Cosmides and John Tooby, Barkow edited the influential book The Adapted Mind: Evolutionary Psychology and the Generation of Culture. In 2006, he edited Missing the Revolution: Darwinism for Social Scientists.

Barkow died at the age of 80 on April 30, 2024 from esophageal cancer.

== See also ==
- Human behavioral ecology
