= David Buller =

American philosopher of science

David J. Buller
- Born: David Joseph Buller; September 12, 1959 (age 67)

Education
- Education: Northwestern University
- Thesis: Problems with Cognitivism: Confirmation, Action, and Realism (1989)
- Doctoral advisor: Arthur Fine

Philosophical work
- Institutions: Northern Illinois University
- Main interests: Criticism of evolutionary psychology
- Notable works: Adapting Minds

David J. Buller (born September 12, 1959) is an American philosopher of science who is Distinguished Research Professor and Chair Emeritus of the Department of Philosophy at Northern Illinois University. He is known for his 2005 book Adapting Minds, in which he presents a detailed philosophical critique of evolutionary psychology. His research has been supported by a grant from the National Science Foundation (award #9985820).
