= Martin Daly (professor) =

Canadian psychologist and academic

- Born: James Martin Daly; November 15, 1944 (age 82); Toronto, Ontario, Canada
- Education: McGill University, University of Toronto
- Spouse: Margo Wilson (deceased)
- Awards: Fellow of the Royal Society of Canada, lifetime achievement award from the Human Behavior and Evolution Society
- Scientific career
- Fields: Evolutionary psychology
- Workplaces: McMaster University
- Thesis: Behavioural development, early experiences, and maternal behaviour in golden hamsters (mesocricetus auratus) (1971)
- Doctoral advisor: Jerry A. Hogan

Martin Daly (born November 15, 1944) is an Emeritus Professor of Psychology at McMaster University in Hamilton, Ontario, Canada, and author of many influential papers on evolutionary psychology. His current research topics include an evolutionary perspective on risk-taking and interpersonal violence, especially male-male conflict and family violence. He and his wife, the late Margo Wilson, were formerly editors-in-chief of the journal Evolution and Human Behavior and presidents of the Human Behavior and Evolution Society.

He was named a Fellow of the Royal Society of Canada in 1998.

Daly is one of the main researchers of the Cinderella effect.

== Books ==
(All books except Killing the Competition co-authored with Margo Wilson)

- Sex, Evolution, and Behaviour (1978)
- Homicide (1988)
- The truth about Cinderella: A Darwinian view of parental love. (1998)
- Killing the Competition: Economic Inequality and Homicide (2016)
