= Margo Wilson =

Canadian psychologist (1942–2009)

Margo Wilson FRSC (1942–2009) was a Canadian evolutionary psychologist. She was a professor of psychology at McMaster University in Hamilton, Ontario, Canada, noted for her pioneering work in the field of evolutionary psychology and her contributions to the study of violence.

== Biography ==
Wilson was born on October 1, 1942, in Winnipeg, Manitoba, Canada. She spent her childhood years in the Gwich'in community of Fort McPherson, where her mother, a nurse, provided medical services. She attended the University of Alberta, graduating with an undergraduate degree in psychology in 1964. She then studied behavioural endocrinology at the University of California and, after winning a Commonwealth Scholarship, at University College London, England, where she earned her PhD in 1972.

From 1972 through 1975, she was a visiting assistant professor at the University of Toronto, where she met her future husband, fellow psychologist Martin Daly. Together, they moved to Hamilton in 1978 after Daly was hired by McMaster University. In the 1980s, Wilson was appointed professor of Psychology at McMaster, where she remained for the rest of her career.

Wilson was elected president of the Human Behavior and Evolution Society in 1997. With Daly, she was, for 10 years, the editor-in-chief of the journal Evolution and Human Behavior,. In 1998, she was named a fellow of the Royal Society.

Wilson died in Hamilton on September 24, 2009, of cancer. In 2009, the Human Behavior and Evolution Society established the Margo Wilson Award (for best paper published in the previous year) to honour her contributions to the field.

== Research ==
In 1978, Wilson proposed the idea to Daly that they could analyze patterns of homicide to better understand humans' social behaviours from an evolutionary perspective. For the next 30 years, Wilson and Daly collaborated on this research, authoring several books and over 100 academic papers and book chapters in this area.

Their first book on this topic, Homicide (1988), has been described as a "founding" and "classic" text for the field of evolutionary psychology. Their second book on homicide, The truth about Cinderella (1999), summarized their findings on the Cinderella effect, which suggests that stepparents are more likely to mistreat children than biological parents.

== Selected bibliography ==
(All books co-authored with Martin Daly)

- Sex, Evolution, and Behaviour, Brooks Cole, 1978 (2nd edition 1983), ISBN 978-0871507679
- Homicide: Foundations of Human Behavior, Aldine Transaction, 1988, ISBN 978-0202011783
- The truth about Cinderella: A Darwinian view of parental love, Yale, 1999, ISBN 9780300080292

== See also ==
- Cinderella effect
- Evolutionary psychology
- Human Behavior and Evolution Society
- Martin Daly
