= Evolution and Human Behavior =

- Discipline: Evolutionary psychology
- Language: English
- Edited by: Debra Lieberman

Publication details
- Former names: Ethology and Sociobiology
- History: 1980–present
- Publisher: Elsevier
- Frequency: Bimonthly
- Open access: Yes
- Impact factor: 4.178 (2020)

Standard abbreviations
- ISO 4: Evol. Hum. Behav.

Indexing
- CODEN: EHIBEF
- ISSN: 1090-5138
- LCCN: 97648255
- OCLC no.: 35307676

Links
- Journal homepage; Online access; Online archive

Evolution and Human Behavior is a bimonthly peer-reviewed academic journal covering research in which evolutionary perspectives are brought to bear on the study of human behavior, ranging from evolutionary psychology to evolutionary anthropology and cultural evolution. It is primarily a scientific journal, but articles from scholars in the humanities are also published. Papers reporting on theoretical and empirical work on other species may be included if their relevance to the human animal is apparent. The journal was established in 1980, and beginning with Volume 18 in 1997 has been published by Elsevier on behalf of the Human Behavior and Evolution Society. The editor-in-chief is Debra Lieberman (University of Miami).

Among more than 300 other psychology and medical journals, Evolution and Human Behavior has adopted result-blind peer review (i.e. where studies are accepted not on the basis of their findings and after the studies are completed, but before the studies are conducted and upon the basis of the methodological rigor of their experimental designs and the theoretical justifications for their statistical analysis techniques before data collection or analysis is done) as part of an initiative organized by the Center for Open Science in response to concerns about the replicability of experimental findings in the sciences and medicine, publication bias, and p-hacking. Early analysis of such reforms in psychology journals has estimated that 61 percent of result-blind studies have led to null results, in contrast to an estimated 5 to 20 percent in earlier psychological research.

== Abstracting and indexing ==
The journal is abstracted and indexed in:

- Anthropological Literature
- Current Contents/Social & Behavioral Sciences
- Embase
- ProQuest databases
- PsycINFO
- Science Citation Index Expanded
- Scopus
- Social Sciences Citation Index

According to the Journal Citation Reports, the journal has a 2020 impact factor of 4.178.

== Best paper award ==
The "Margo Wilson Award" is an annual award presented for the best paper published in the journal in the previous year.
