= Leda Cosmides =

American psychologist

- Born: May 9, 1957 (age 68); Philadelphia, Pennsylvania, U.S.
- Known for: Evolutionary psychology
- Spouse: John Tooby

Leda Cosmides (born May 1957) is an American psychologist, who, together with anthropologist husband John Tooby, pioneered the field of evolutionary psychology.

== Biography ==
Cosmides was born into a Greek family. Her parents, George Cosmides and Nasia Cosmides (née Murlas), founded the St George Greek Orthodox Church in Bethesda, Maryland.

Cosmides originally studied biology at Radcliffe College/Harvard University, receiving her BA in 1979. While an undergraduate, she was influenced by the renowned evolutionary biologist Robert L. Trivers, who was her advisor. In 1985, Cosmides received a PhD in cognitive psychology from Harvard. After completing postdoctoral work under Roger Shepard at Stanford University, she joined the faculty of the University of California, Santa Barbara in 1991, becoming a full professor in 2000.

In 1992, together with Tooby and Jerome Barkow, Cosmides edited The Adapted Mind: Evolutionary Psychology and the Generation of Culture. She and Tooby also co-founded and co-direct the Center for Evolutionary Psychology.

Cosmides was awarded the 1988 American Association for the Advancement of Science Prize for Behavioral Science Research, the 1993 American Psychological Association Distinguished Scientific Award for an Early Career Contribution to Psychology, a Guggenheim Fellowship, the 2005 National Institutes of Health Director's Pioneer Award, and the 2020 Jean Nicod Prize. In 2023, she was elected to the American Academy of Arts and Sciences.

== Selected publications ==
Books

- Barkow, J., Cosmides, L. & Tooby, J., (eds) (1992) The Adapted Mind: Evolutionary psychology and the generation of culture (New York: Oxford University Press).
- Tooby, J. & Cosmides, L. (2000) Evolutionary psychology: Foundational papers (Cambridge, MA: MIT Press).
- Cosmides, L. & Tooby, J. (in press) Universal Minds: Explaining the new science of evolutionary psychology (Darwinism Today Series) (London: Weidenfeld & Nicolson).

Papers

- Cosmides, L. & Tooby, J. (1981) Cytoplasmic inheritance and intragenomic conflict. Journal of Theoretical Biology, 89, 83-129.
- Cosmides, L. & Tooby, J. (1987) "From evolution to behavior: Evolutionary psychology as the missing link" in J. Dupre (ed.), The latest on the best: Essays on evolution and optimality (Cambridge, MA: The MIT Press).
- Cosmides, L. (1989) "The logic of social exchange: Has natural selection shaped how humans reason? Studies with the Wason selection task," Cognition, 31, 187–276.
- Cosmides, L. & Tooby, J. (1992) "Cognitive adaptations for social exchange," in Barkow, J., Cosmides, L. & Tooby, J., (eds) (1992) The adapted mind: Evolutionary psychology and the generation of culture (New York: Oxford University Press).
- Cosmides, L. & Tooby, J. (2003) "Evolutionary psychology: Theoretical Foundations," in Encyclopedia of Cognitive Science (London: Macmillan).
- Tooby, J. & Cosmides, L. (2005) "Evolutionary psychology: Conceptual foundations," in D. M. Buss (ed.), Handbook of Evolutionary Psychology (New York: Wiley).
- Cosmides, Leda; Tooby, John (2008). "Evolutionary Psychology". In Hamowy, Ronald (ed.). Evolution Psychology. The Encyclopedia of Libertarianism. Thousand Oaks, CA: SAGE; Cato Institute. pp. 158–61. doi:10.4135/9781412965811.n99. ISBN 978-1412965804. LCCN 2008009151. OCLC 750831024.

== See also ==
- Behavioural genetics
- Human behavioral ecology
- Standard social science model
- The Adapted Mind
