= John Tooby =

American anthropologist (1952–2023)

- Born: July 26, 1952; Saint Paul, Minnesota, U.S.
- Died: November 10, 2023 (aged 71)
- Known for: Evolutionary psychology
- Spouse: Leda Cosmides

John Tooby (July 26, 1952 – November 10, 2023) was an American anthropologist who, together with his psychologist wife Leda Cosmides, pioneered the field of evolutionary psychology.

== Biography ==
Tooby received his PhD in Biological Anthropology from Harvard University in 1989 and was Professor of Anthropology at the University of California, Santa Barbara (UCSB).

In 1992, together with Cosmides and Jerome Barkow, Tooby edited The Adapted Mind: Evolutionary Psychology and the Generation of Culture. Tooby and Cosmides also co-founded and co-directed the UCSB Center for Evolutionary Psychology. Cosmides and Tooby jointly received the 2020 Jean Nicod Prize.

Tooby died on November 10, 2023, at the age of 71.

== Selected publications ==
=== Books ===
- Barkow, J., Cosmides, L. & Tooby, J., (Eds.) (1992). The adapted mind: Evolutionary psychology and the generation of culture. New York: Oxford University Press.
- Tooby, J. & Cosmides, L. (in press). Evolutionary psychology: Foundational papers. Cambridge, MA: MIT Press.
- Cosmides, L. & Tooby, J. (in press). Universal Minds: Explaining the new science of evolutionary psychology(Darwinism Today Series). London: Weidenfeld & Nicolson.

=== Papers ===
- Cosmides, L. & Tooby, J. (1981). Cytoplasmic inheritance and intragenomic conflict. Journal of Theoretical Biology, 89, 83–129.
- Cosmides, L. & Tooby, J. (1987). From evolution to behavior: Evolutionary psychology as the missing link. In J. Dupre (Ed.), The latest on the best: Essays on evolution and optimality. Cambridge, MA: The MIT Press.
- Tooby, J. & Cosmides, L. (1990). The past explains the present: Emotional adaptations and the structure of ancestral environments. Ethology and Sociobiology, 11, 375–424.
- Cosmides, L. & Tooby, J. (1992) Cognitive adaptations for social exchange. In J. Barkow, L. Cosmides, & J. Tooby (Eds.), The adapted mind: Evolutionary psychology and the generation of culture. New York: Oxford University Press.
- Cosmides, L. & Tooby, J. (1994). Beyond intuition and instinct blindness: Toward an evolutionarily rigorous cognitive science. Cognition, 50(1–3), 41–77.
- Cosmides, L. & Tooby, J. (2003). Evolutionary psychology: Theoretical Foundations. In Encyclopedia of Cognitive Science. London: Macmillan.
- Tooby, J. & Cosmides, L. (2005). Evolutionary psychology: Conceptual foundations. In D. M. Buss (Ed.), Evolutionary Psychology Handbook. New York: Wiley.
- Cosmides, Leda; Tooby, John (2008). "Evolutionary Psychology". In Hamowy, Ronald (ed.). Evolution Psychology. The Encyclopedia of Libertarianism. Thousand Oaks, CA: SAGE; Cato Institute. pp. 158–61. doi:10.4135/9781412965811.n99. ISBN 978-1412965804. LCCN 2008009151. OCLC 750831024.

== See also ==
- Behavioural genetics
- Human behavioral ecology
- Standard social science model
