= Human behavioral ecology =

Study of human behavior and cultural diversity

Human behavioral ecology (HBE) or human evolutionary ecology applies the principles of evolutionary theory and optimization to the study of human behavioral and cultural diversity. HBE examines the adaptive design of traits, behaviors, and life histories of humans in an ecological context. One aim of modern human behavioral ecology is to determine how ecological and social factors influence and shape behavioral flexibility within and between human populations. Among other things, HBE attempts to explain variation in human behavior as adaptive solutions to the competing life-history demands of growth, development, reproduction, parental care, and mate acquisition. HBE overlaps with evolutionary psychology, human or cultural ecology, and decision theory. It is most prominent in disciplines such as anthropology and psychology where human evolution is considered relevant for a holistic understanding of human behavior.

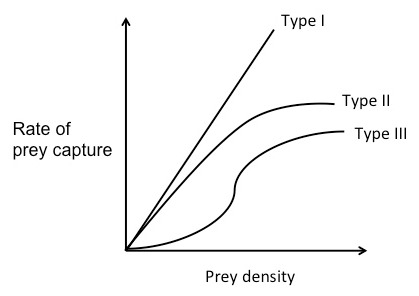
An example of a functional response curve, commonly used in studies of human behavioral ecology. Here, trait variants (such as hunting method) are denoted as "Types", and their success rates are plotted as a function of prey density. Adapted from Staddon.

== Evolutionary theory ==
Human behavioral ecology rests upon a foundation of evolutionary theory. This includes aspects of both general evolutionary theory and established middle-level evolutionary theories, as well. Aspects of general evolutionary theory include:

- Natural selection, the process by which individual organisms with favorable traits are more likely to survive and reproduce.
- Sexual selection, the theory that competition for mates between individuals of the same sex results in differential mating and reproduction.
- Kin selection, the changes in gene frequency across generations that are driven at least in part by interactions between related individuals.
- Inclusive fitness, the sum of an individual's own reproductive success, (natural and sexual selection), plus the effects the individual's actions have on the reproductive success of that individual's kin, (kin selection).

Middle-level evolutionary theories used in HBE include:

- The theory of parental investment, which predicts that the sex making the largest investment in lactation, nurturing and protecting offspring will be more discriminating in mating and that the sex that invests less in offspring will compete for access to the higher investing sex.
- Parent–offspring conflict, which predicts that because the genetic interests of parents and offspring are not identical, offspring will be selected to manipulate their parents in order to ensure higher investment, and that, conversely, parents will be selected to manipulate their offspring.
- The Blurton-Jones "backload model" of human birth spacing, where birth intervals in human foraging lineages balance high energetic demands and resource scarcity with lifetime reproductive success.
- The theory of reciprocal altruism, a form of altruism in which one organism provides a benefit to another in the expectation of future reciprocation.
- The Trivers–Willard hypothesis, which proposes that parents should invest more in the sex that gives them the greatest reproductive payoff (grandchildren) with increasing or marginal investment.
- r/K selection theory, which, in ecology, relates to the selection of traits in organisms that allow success in particular environments. r-selected species – in unstable or unpredictable environments – produce many offspring, any individual one of which is unlikely to survive to adulthood, while K-selected species – in stable or predictable environments – invest more heavily in fewer offspring, each of which has a better chance of surviving to adulthood.
- Evolutionary game theory, the application of population genetics-inspired models of change in gene frequency in populations to game theory.
- Evolutionarily stable strategy, which refers to a strategy, which if adopted by a population, cannot be invaded by any competing alternative strategy.

== Basic principles ==
=== Methodology ===
As a subdiscipline of ecology, HBE draws upon systemic and individualistic frameworks in studying human relational patterns. Breaking down complex socioecological patterns into their structural-functional relationships allows scientists to describe social behaviour from the perspective of the overall ecosystem rather than isolated agents. An example of the research methodology in practice might see a scientist examining marriage rates by taking into account local options, cultural preferences, socioeconomic status, political freedoms, and so forth.

=== Ecological selectionism ===
Ecological selectionism refers to the assumption that humans are highly flexible in their behaviors. Furthermore, it assumes that various ecological forces select for various behaviors that optimize humans' inclusive fitness in their given ecological context.

=== Conditional strategies ===
Human behavioral ecologists assume that what might be the most adaptive strategy in one environment might not be the most adaptive strategy in another environment. Conditional strategies, therefore, can be represented in the following statement:

- In environmental context X, engage in adaptive strategy A.
- In environmental context Y, engage in adaptive strategy B.

=== Phenotypic gambit ===
The phenotypic gambit refers to the simplifying assumption that complex traits, such as behavioural traits, can be modelled as if they were controlled by single distinct alleles, representing alternate strategies. In other words, the phenotypic gambit assumes that "selection will favour traits with high fitness ...irrespective of the particulars of inheritance."

=== Modeling ===
Theoretical models that human behavioral ecologists employ include, but are not limited to:

- Optimal foraging theory, which states that organisms focus on consuming the most energy while expending the least amount of energy.
- Life history theory, which postulates that many of the physiological traits and behaviors of individuals may be best understood in relation to the key maturational and reproductive characteristics that define the life course.
- Sex allocation theory, which predicts that parents should bias their reproductive investments toward the offspring sex generating the greatest fitness return.
- The polygyny threshold model, which suggests that polygyny is driven by female choice of mates who control more resources relative to other potential mates in the population.

== See also ==
- Behavioral ecology
- Biocultural evolution
- Dual inheritance theory
- Evolutionary developmental psychology
- Evolutionary educational psychology
- Foraging, Autonomous foraging
- Hypergamy
- Human reproductive ecology
- Mating system
- Psychogenomics
