= Risk-sensitive foraging models =

Risk-sensitive foraging models help to explain the variance in foraging behaviour in animals. This model allows powerful predictions to be made about expected foraging behaviour for individual groups of animals. Risk sensitive foraging is based on experimental evidence that the net energy budget level of an animal is predictive of type of foraging activity an animal will employ. Experimental evidence has indicated that individuals will change the type of foraging strategy that they use depending on environmental conditions and ability to meet net energy levels. When individuals can meet net energy level requirements by accessing food in risk aversive methods they do so. However, when net energy level requirements are not met by employing risk aversive methods, individuals are more likely to take risk prone actions in order to meet their net energy requirements.

== Caraco’s experiment (Juncos) ==
Thomas Caraco and his colleagues in 1980 were amongst the first to study risk sensitive foraging behaviour in yellow-eyed juncos. For the original study seven yellow-eyed juncos were used in a two-part experiment. Part one examined foraging behaviours in five juncos when they were given a choice of eating on a perch where enough seeds were placed every time to meet their 24-hour energy requirements, or on a perch where they would sometimes find an abundance of seeds and sometimes no seeds. All individuals showed a preference to feed at the perch where they could get their daily seed requirement, the risk aversive choice. Part two examined foraging preference in four juncos, on one perch seeds were present every time but not enough to meet their 24-hour energy requirement. On the other perch they could sometimes find an abundance of seeds or no seeds. In this case the juncos showed a preference to feeding at the variable reward perch, choosing the risk prone feeding option. In order to test if individuals would change their strategy as a result of changed environment, two of the juncos from part one were used in part two of the experiment. As expected the juncos from part one who preferred the risk aversive foraging strategy switched to risk prone foraging behaviour in part two of the experiment.

Thomas Caraco conducted a follow up experiment in 1981 with dark-eyed juncos and used a larger sample size. The results were similar. Dark-eyed juncos prefer risk aversive foraging behaviours when their 24-hour energy budgets can be met. However, when 24hr energy budgets are not met the juncos employ risk prone foraging behavior.

== Other examples ==
Risk sensitive foraging has also been found in other animal species. Laboratory rats have also been found to display risk sensitive foraging. Rats prefer to forage at a constant food supply source if they are able to meet their energy requirements. But will employ risk prone foraging behaviour when the constant food supply source does not fulfill their daily energy requirement.

The common shrew has also been found to use risk sensitive foraging methods. Choosing to be risk aversive when they are able to constantly meet their energy requirements. But switching over to risk prone foraging and variable reward when their energy requirements are not met regularly.

== Possible exceptions ==
Follow-up studies conducted in hummingbirds have found conflicting evidence about risk sensitivity foraging. When the hummingbirds are given three different choices of food supply, risk sensitivity foraging model was not entirely accurate at predicting foraging strategy. When deciding to obtain food from experimentally manipulated flowers containing: low variance, high variance or constant nectar. Hummingbirds were found to prefer nectar from the low variance flower more than any other choice. Researchers suggest that these results may be attributed to the possibility that the hummingbirds were not able to examine the amount of nectar present in each flower visually.
