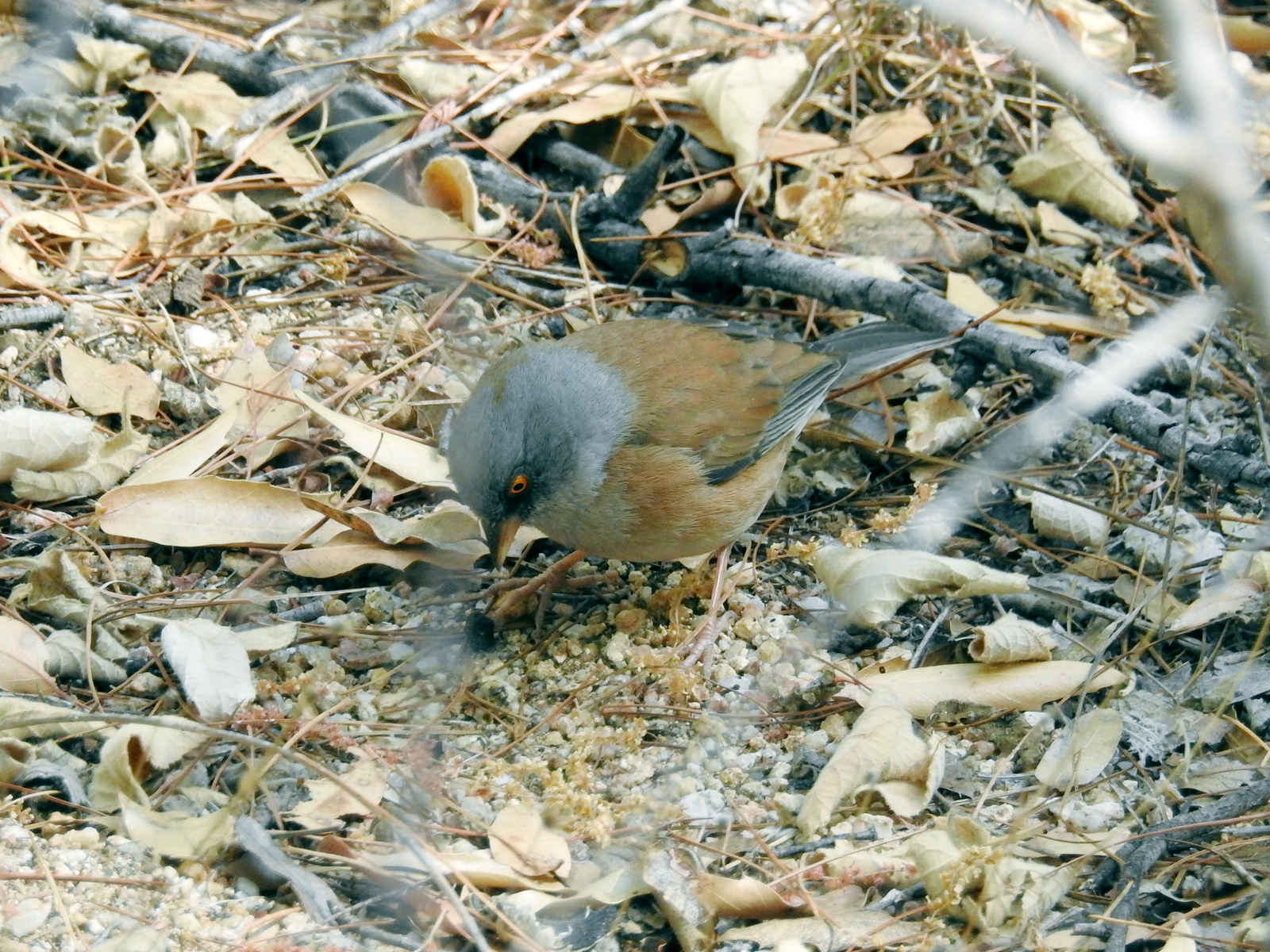

Conservation status
- Near Threatened (IUCN 3.1)

Scientific classification
- Kingdom: Animalia
- Phylum: Chordata
- Class: Aves
- Order: Passeriformes
- Family: Passerellidae
- Genus: Junco
- Species: J. bairdi

Binomial name
- Junco bairdi Ridgway, 1883

Synonyms
- Junco phaeonotus bairdi

= Baird's junco =

Species of bird

Baird's junco (Junco bairdi) is a species of junco, a group of small, grayish New World sparrows. It is endemic to the forests in the higher elevations of the Sierra de la Laguna mountain range of the southern Baja California peninsula in Baja California Sur, Mexico.

== Taxonomy and systematics ==
While originally described as a distinct species, it was once considered a subspecies of the yellow-eyed junco (Junco phaeonotus) before being recognized as a distinct species again in 2014 by the AOS after further research. Within the genus junco, Baird's junco is the outgroup to all other juncos with the exception of the volcano junco, having diverged from other members of the genus more than 350,000 years ago despite retaining a phenotype similar to other North American juncos.

=== Etymology ===
The type specimens of Baird's junco were collected on February 2, 1883, by Lyman Belding at "Laguna, Lower California" [=Baja California], and it was named for Spencer Fullerton Baird, an American ornithologist and naturalist, by Robert Ridgway, the curator of birds at the United States National Museum at that time.

== Description ==
Baird's junco is approximately average-sized for a New World sparrow, with males being (on average) larger than females and most individuals being approximately 15 centimetres (5.9 in) in length with a mass of approximately 18 grams (0.63 oz). Baird's junco have the shortest wings (69 millimetres (2.7 in)) and the shortest tails (62 millimetres (2.4 in)) of any member of the genus Junco, something that is likely correlated to their sedentary, non-migratory nature.

=== Plumage ===
Baird's juncos are sexually monomorphic, and adult Baird's juncos have gray heads with black lores, buffy brown backs, wings, and flanks, and paler gray or white throats blending into a pale whitish chest, belly, and vent. Some individuals are browner below, with color from the flanks covering more of the undersides. Like other members of the genus junco, the outermost tail feathers are white, giving a distinct white flash when birds fly. Baird's juncos have bright yellow eyes, and dull pinkish to pinkish-horn or yellow-orange bills with a maxilla usually darker than the mandible, giving a bicolored appearance to the bill.

=== Vocalizations ===
The vocalizations of Baird's junco are quite distinct, and are significantly different from other populations of "yellow-eyed" juncos in North America. Baird's junco songs are fairly complex, especially for the genus junco, and consist of longer songs with multiple unique phrases and few repeats of phrases within each song.

== Distribution and habitat ==
Baird's junco is restricted to the higher elevations of the Sierra de la Laguna, Baja California Sur, Mexico, where it nests in pine-oak forests. This species is largely restricted to the higher elevations above 1,500 metres (4,900 ft) where appropriate habitat occurs, but non-breeding individuals do wander lower down, with previous sources considering the bird common above 3,000 feet (910 m) in elevation and more contemporary sources noting records as low as 700 metres (2,300 ft) in elevation. These low elevational records have been attributed to non-breeding individuals, and no significant pattern of elevational migration has been noted.
