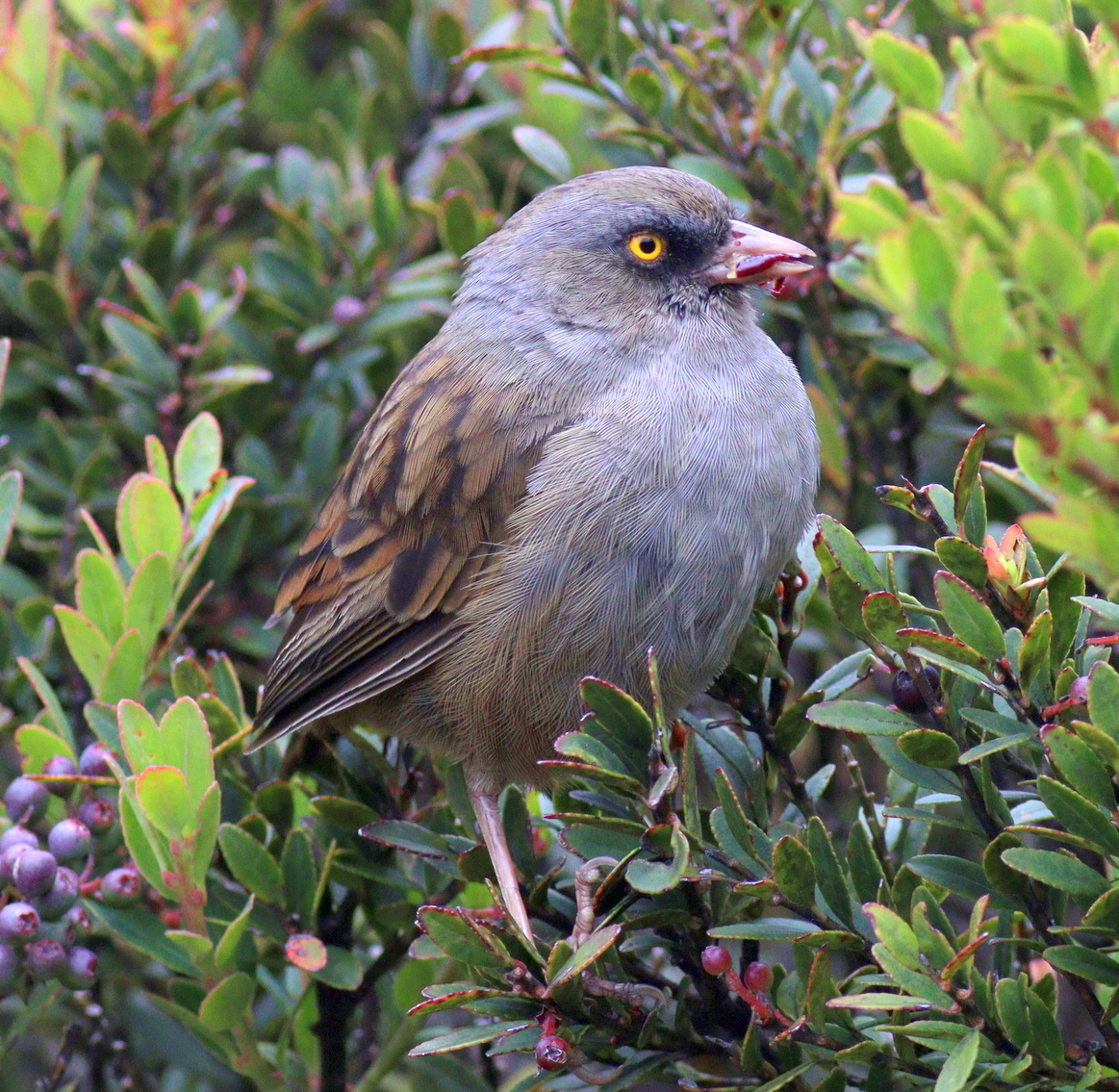
- In Cerro de la Muerte, Costa Rica

Conservation status
- Least Concern (IUCN 3.1)

Scientific classification
- Kingdom: Animalia
- Phylum: Chordata
- Class: Aves
- Order: Passeriformes
- Family: Passerellidae
- Genus: Junco
- Species: J. vulcani

Binomial name
- Junco vulcani (Boucard, 1878)

= Volcano junco =

Species of bird

The volcano junco (Junco vulcani) is a species of bird in the family Passerellidae, the New World sparrows. It is found in Costa Rica and Panama.

== Taxonomy and systematics ==
The volcano junco was formally described in 1878 with the binomial Zonotrichia vulcani. It was eventually reassigned to its present genus Junco that had been erected in 1831.

The volcano junco is monotypic. Though a 1970 publication considered it, the dark-eyed junco (J. hyemalis), and the yellow-eyed junco (J. phaenotus) to be sister species, evaluations in the early 2000s showed that it is basal to the genus and not closely related to the other Junco species.

== Description ==
The volcano junco is about 16 cm (6.3 in) long and weighs about 28 g (0.99 oz). The sexes have the same plumage. Adults have a grayish olive crown and nape, sometimes with dusky streaks. They have black lores and a black or slate black "mask" around the eye. The rest of their head and neck are pale gray with an olive tinge on the ear coverts. Their upperparts are buffy brown with black streaks. Their wings are dusky with thin to somewhat wider buffy brown feather edges. Their tail is dusky with thin gray feather edges and pale gray tips on the outermost pair. Their underparts are mostly pale gray that is palest on the throat; the flanks have a buffy brown wash. They have an orange-yellow to bright yellow iris, a pink bill with sometimes a darker maxilla, and pink to pale brownish white legs and feet. Juveniles have somewhat reddish brown upperparts with heavier streaking than adults. Their underparts are dingy buff with dusky streaks except in the center of the belly. They have a dark brown iris.

== Distribution and habitat ==
The volcano junco is the southernmost member of its genus. It is found intermittently from the eastern part of Costa Rica's Cordillera Central south through the Cordillera de Talamanca to Volcán Barú in far western Panama's Chiriquí Province. It inhabits paramo grasslands, humid montane scrublands, and similar open landscapes such as overgrown pastures. Sources are in general agreement on its elevational range. A twentieth century one states it is 2,700 to 3,600 m (8,900 to 11,800 ft). A 2007 field guide places the species above 2,700 m (8,900 ft) without stating an upper limit. A 2020 publication says the species "primarily occurs above 3,000 m (9,800 ft)" but locally as low as 2,600 m (8,500 ft) where deforestation has opened the landscape. It also notes an isolated population on Cerro Dúrika at about 2,100 m (6,900 ft).

== Behavior ==
=== Movement ===
The volcano junco is a year-round resident.

=== Feeding ===
The volcano junco's diet has not been studied in detail but is known to include seeds, fallen berries, insects, and spiders. It forages on the ground while running and hopping. It seldom flies long distances. It usually forages singly, in pairs, or in small family groups. It is not known to join mixed-species feeding flocks.

=== Breeding ===
The volcano junco breeds between March and July. Its nest is a cup made from grass with sometimes moss on the outside. It is lined with plant floss and animal hair. Nests have been found on the ground, under rocks, logs, and bushes, and in a cavity in an earthen bank. The clutch is two eggs that are pale blue with sparse brown or lilac dots. The incubation period, time to fledging, and details of parental care are not known.

=== Vocalization ===
The volcano junco makes "a variety of high, weak utterances". These are described in more detail as ""short, choppy phrases of squeaky, burbling, or buzzy notes: k'cheew, chu k'wee, chip-chip ts'chew tsi'weet, etc.". Its calls include "a high thin, tsee or tsee-tsee; a scolding, clear, or scratchy whew or jeew; a repeated tchup or tchip when excited, and a fast, rhythmical cher-we cher-we cher-we".

== Status ==
The IUCN has assessed the volcano junco as being of Least Concern. It has a small range; its estimated population of at least 20,000 mature individuals is believed to be stable. The only identified threat is potential degradation of its habitat as a result of climate change. One source states that the species is "common to frequent" and another says it is "fairly common". "In the short term, human activity probably has little effect on Volcano Junco; it may even benefit, locally, from deforestation that creates more of the open habitats that it occupies."
