= Evolutionary psychiatry =

Discipline of psychiatry based on evolutionary biology

Evolutionary psychiatry, also known as Darwinian psychiatry, is a theoretical approach to psychiatry that aims to explain psychiatric disorders in evolutionary terms. As a branch of the field of evolutionary medicine, it is distinct from the medical practice of psychiatry in its emphasis on providing scientific explanations rather than treatments for mental disorders.

This often concerns questions of ultimate causation. For example, psychiatric genetics may discover genes associated with mental disorders, but evolutionary psychiatry asks why those genes persist in the population. Other core questions in evolutionary psychiatry are why heritable mental disorders are so common, how to distinguish mental function and dysfunction, and whether certain forms of suffering conveyed an adaptive advantage.

Disorders commonly considered are depression, anxiety, schizophrenia, autism, eating disorders, and others. Key explanatory concepts include evolutionary mismatch (when modern environments cause mental health conditions) and the fact that evolution is guided by reproductive success rather than health or wellbeing. Rather than providing an alternative account of the cause of mental disorder, evolutionary psychiatry seeks to integrate findings from traditional schools of psychology and psychiatry such as social psychology, behaviourism, biological psychiatry and psychoanalysis into a holistic account related to evolutionary biology. In this sense, its aims meet the criteria of a Kuhnian paradigm shift.

Evolutionary psychiatry is heavily influenced by evolutionary psychology, but as Abed and St John-Smith wrote in 2016, "Unlike evolutionary psychology, which is a vibrant and thriving sub-discipline of academic psychology with a strong and well-funded research program, evolutionary psychiatry remains the interest of a small number of psychiatrists who are thinly scattered across the world." It has gained increasing institutional recognition in recent years, including the formation of an evolutionary psychiatry special interest group within the Royal College of Psychiatrists and the Section on Evolutionary Psychiatry within the World Psychiatric Association, and has gained traction with the publication of texts aimed at a popular audience such as Good Reasons for Bad Feelings: Insight from the Frontier of Evolutionary Psychiatry by Randolph Nesse.

== History ==
The pursuit of evolutionary psychiatry in its modern form can be traced to the late 20th century. Landmark texts include George Williams and Randolph Nesse's Why We Get Sick: The New Science of Darwinian Medicine (which could also be considered as marking the beginning of evolutionary medicine), Evolutionary Psychiatry: A New Beginning by John Price and Anthony Stevens, and others. However, the questions with which evolutionary psychiatry concerns itself have a longer history, for instance being recognised by Julian Huxley and Ernst Mayr in an early paper considering possible evolutionary explanations for what has become known as the 'schizophrenia paradox'.

Concepts applied by modern evolutionary psychiatry to explain mental disorder are also much older than the field in many cases. Psychological suffering as an inevitable, and sometimes useful, part of human existence has long been recognised, and the idea of divine madness pervades ancient societies and religions. Cesare Lombroso, a pioneering psychiatrist, began utilising evolutionary theory to explain mental disorder as early as 1864, proposing that insanity was the price of genius, as human brains had not evolved with the capacity to become hyper-intelligent and creative and yet remain sane. Darwin applied evolutionary theory to explain psychological traits and emotions, and recognised the usefulness of studying mental disorders in pursuit of understanding natural psychological function. Freud was heavily influenced by Darwinian theory, and towards the end of his life recommended psychoanalysts should study evolutionary theory. Bowlby's attachment theory was developed in explicit reference to evolutionary theory.

=== Evolutionary Psychiatry Special Interest Group (EPSIG) ===
In 2016, the Evolutionary Psychiatry Special Interest Group (EPSIG) was set up in the Royal College of Psychiatrists, UK by Riadh Abed and Paul St-John Smith. It is now the largest global institution for connecting psychiatrists and researchers interested in evolutionary psychiatry, with over 1700 members. It has run several seminars and meetings dedicated to evolutionary psychiatry, hosting lectures by prominent academics such as Simon Baron-Cohen and Robin Dunbar. All of the meetings are available on the EPSIGUK YouTube channel. EPSIG also publishes regular newsletters, organises conferences, conducts interviews, and hosts special essays related to evolutionary psychiatry (for which there is not yet a dedicated academic journal). As Riadh Abed (previous chair) stated in a newsletter, "Our aims are both big and radical: they are for evolution to be accepted as the overarching framework for psychiatry and for evolution to take center stage in our understanding of mental health and mental disorder."

Abed and St-John Smith edited a 2022 volume Evolutionary Psychiatry: Current Perspectives on Evolution and Mental Health, co-published by the Royal College of Psychiatrists and Cambridge University Press, marking the most extensive publication in the field to date, and forming the basis for the first podcast dedicated to evolutionary psychiatry, the 'Evolving Psychiatry' podcast.

== Psychological function and dysfunction ==
Mental disorders are often defined by 'dysfunction' in psychiatric manuals such as the DSM, without a precise definition of what constitutes dysfunction, allowing any mental state deemed socially unacceptable (such as homosexuality) to be considered dysfunctional, and thus a mental disorder.

Adam Hunt argues that evolutionary theory is uniquely placed to be able to distinguish biological function from dysfunction by evolutionary processes. Unlike the objects and processes of physics and chemistry, which cannot strictly be said to be functioning nor dysfunctioning, biological systems are the products of evolution by natural selection, and so their 'function' and 'dysfunction' can be related to that evolutionary process. The concept of evolutionary function is tied to the reproductive success brought about by phenotypes which caused genes to be propagated. Eyes evolved to see – the function of the eyes is to see – so dysfunctional eyes are those that cannot see. This sense of function is defined by the evolutionary history of eyesight providing reproductive success, not current cultural opinions of normality and abnormality on which common conceptions of health and disorder often depend. Jerome Wakefield's influential 'Harmful Dysfunction' definition of disorder utilises evolutionarily selected effects to ground the concept of 'dysfunction' in the objective process of evolution. Wakefield proposes that mental disorder must be both harmful, in a value-defined sense, and dysfunctional, in an evolutionary sense.

This grounding of dysfunction in an objective historical process is important in the context of psychiatry's history of labelling socially undesirable mental states and traits as 'disorders', such as female masturbation and homosexuality. Current diagnostic manuals are decided by consensus. For example, in 1973 the APA called a vote to reconsider homosexuality's status as a mental disorder. By a 58% majority, it was struck off. The category of borderline personality disorder was created upon the basis of a single paper and consensus between about a dozen psychiatrists. In 2014 psychiatrists voted on the features of a new disorder, internet gaming disorder. Psychiatry's reliance on votes and expert consensus rather than objective evidence or biomarkers has been the subject of longstanding criticism, which evolutionary psychiatry can avoid by adopting the evolutionary definition of dysfunction.

== Evolutionary causation and Tinbergen's four questions ==
The research questions and concerns of evolutionary medicine and psychiatry can be distinguished from normal biomedicine and biological-psychiatry research as asking ultimate instead of proximate questions. This ultimate-proximate distinction was introduced by Ernst Mayr to identify different levels of causational explanation: proximate explanations refer to mechanistic biological processes (e.g. genes, ontogenetic development, hormones, neurological structure and function) whilst ultimate explanations ask about the evolutionary process of natural selection which led to these biological structures and processes functioning as observed. This could be conceived of as proximate explanations are 'how' questions whilst ultimate explanations are 'why' questions.

Niko Tinbergen further deconstructed this ultimate-proximate distinction into his 'four questions'. These questions of mechanism, ontogeny, function and phylogeny can be asked of any single trait or disorder (often behavioural, although not necessarily) to identify the different questions of causation which are simultaneously relevant.

Proximate questions can be separated into questions of mechanism, which concerns how the trait works, the structure and process of its biological mechanism, and questions of ontogeny or individual development which concerns how the trait develops in an individual. Ultimate questions can be either of or evolutionary function or adaptive value, which concerns how the trait influenced fitness throughout evolutionary history; and questions of phylogeny or evolution, which concern the history of a trait down the phylogenetic tree. To take the example of depression, we can ask about proximate mechanisms (e.g., neurotransmitter properties), ontogenetic development (e.g., neurological development over an individual's lifespan), adaptive function (e.g., low mood system) and phylogeny (e.g., apparent low mood in reaction to social defeat in primates).

== Key explanatory concepts in evolutionary psychiatry ==
Mental disorder results from many different environmental and genetic causes, with various complex neurological correlates – but evolutionary medicine recognises several general principles which allow vulnerability to disorder. Adapted from Nesse (2019), Stearns (2016) and Gluckman (2016).

=== Reproductive success over health ===
Natural selection acts on reproductive fitness, not biological states which are what may be considered healthy; healthy states are only selected if they also have positive effects on reproductive success. This is used in evolutionary medicine to explain aging and diseases of senescence: diseases which appear past reproductive age have minimal effect on fecundity. Psychological suffering and various cognitive states which may seem unhealthy or disorderly may equally be products of evolutionary processes if they increased reproductive success. Evidence of this may be seen in disorders associated with substantial apparent dysfunction, yet average levels of fertility.

=== Mismatch ===
Evolutionary mismatch occurs when evolved traits become maladaptive due to changes in the environment. This is a common factor causing evolutionary change (e.g. in the peppered moth) and is relevant to medicine when the mismatched traits cause problems affecting health. Psychiatric conditions may in some cases be evolved states which we are misinterpreting as disorders because they no longer fit our social expectations; or they may be mental states or traits which would manifest healthily in ancestral environments, but become pathological due to some feature of modern environments. Evidence of mismatch is most prominent when comparing traditional-living humans to modern-living humans or when new environmental factors arise which clearly cause disease (e.g. the availability of cheap, high calorie foods causing obesity).

=== Defences ===
Psychological responses such as fear and panic are adaptive in many situations, especially of imminent danger, and seen in multiple species. Certain mental disorders may result from such responses, either as a maladaptive overactivation of the response, or as an adaptive process which is specifically tuned to over-activate because the fitness cost of the response is outweighed by the fitness benefit – called the smoke detector principle. The fact that such experiences are highly distressing, debilitating and inappropriate leads to their diagnosis as mental disorders.

=== Mutation-selection balance ===
Natural selection acts upon genetic mutations, which are present in every generation, removing those which reduce fitness and increasing the prevalence of those which improve fitness. Mutations are also more likely to reduce fitness than improve it. Biological traits with a large mutational target size, such as brains, where over 80% of the genome is expressed, are especially likely to be suspect to harmful mutations which negatively affect cognitive function, which are then removed by natural selection. Such mutations are often associated with intellectual disability, certain cases of autism, schizophrenia, and many more disorders. The fact that de-novo mutations cause such disorders in a few cases has been used to argue that the other cases are caused by as-yet undiscovered disease processes, although the presence of heterogeneity within disorder categories and the lack of discovered pathology despite significant work in neuroscience and genetics is evidence against that view.

== Evolutionary explanations for specific disorders ==
=== Schizophrenia ===
Schizophrenia is primarily characterized by psychosis (hallucinations and delusions) and symptoms of cognitive debilitation such as erratic speech, lost interest in normal activities and disordered thinking. It is the most extreme condition of the schizophrenia spectrum, which includes schizophrenia and other psychotic disorders, arguably extending beyond clinical disorders to unusual experiences such as perceiving ghosts or believing in magic which are common in the population.

Schizophrenia is a heritable condition, appearing in slightly less than 1% of the population, with negative effects of fecundity, especially in men. Because of this, it was perhaps the first psychiatric condition explicitly raised as specifically requiring an evolutionary explanation, in the so-called 'schizophrenia paradox' (now more generally known as the paradox of common, harmful, heritable mental disorders). To explain schizophrenia's persistence, various evolutionary hypotheses have been proposed.

Hypotheses of schizophrenia as a true dysfunction are plentiful. It has been hypothesised that schizophrenia is a dysfunctional byproduct of human evolution for language and brain lateralization, or a dysfunction of the social brain, or related to theory-of-mind. Other theories have referred to the possibility it is caused by mutation-selection balance. However, the expected rare and de novo mutations have only been found in a small proportion of cases. Many alleles predisposing individuals to schizophrenia are common in the population, making adaptive hypotheses plausible, as has been noted since the mid-20th century.

Hypotheses explaining schizophrenia as resulting from adaptation vary widely. Early theorists proposed it conveyed improvements to the immune system or illness recovery or facilitated group-splitting. Inspired by the longstanding cultural ideas of madness as related to genius, Daniel Nettle proposed that schizotypy could be related to creative success, which added to mating success, and that the positive effects of schizotypal traits might be an explanation for why these traits persist. However, the measured fecundity benefit of such traits has been found to not outweigh the cost of schizophrenia via inclusive fitness (although this may be due to selection bias).

The shamanism hypothesis of schizophrenia states that in traditional societies the experience of psychosis facilitated the induction of shamans (magico-religious practitioners such as medicine men, diviners, witch doctors, exorcists and mediums). Shamanism is a common feature of human societies, with certain individuals deemed to have a particular connection to the supernatural world which gives them the ability to perform magic, especially healing. This has been used by proponents of the shamanism hypothesis to explain why psychotic experiences often feature religious and grandiose content and beliefs of holding supernatural powers, claims which may have been accepted by society more broadly in traditional cultures. The onset of schizophrenia also closely resembles shamanic initiations, which often feature hallucinations, delusions and incoherent speech. Possible links between shamanism and insanity have been recognised for many decades by anthropologists (e.g. "...mentally ill people are often regarded as holy in primitive societies" and "Feeblemindedness is treated with scorn in Niue today, but insanity still calls forth respect") but the most recent iteration of the theory has been advanced by Joseph Polimeni, who argues that shamans facilitate group functioning, and so psychosis evolved as a result of group selection. Critics have argued that the trance states and self-control exhibited by shamans are unlike the characteristics of schizophrenia.

=== Attention Deficit Hyperactivity Disorder (ADHD) ===
Research on Attention Deficit Hyperactivity Disorder (ADHD) in evolutionary psychiatry explores the origins of this condition by considering how certain traits may have been advantageous in ancestral environments. Within this framework, the goal is to understand why behaviors associated with the disorder persist in the human population.

One hypothesis suggests that traits like hyperactivity, impulsivity, and novelty-seeking were beneficial for hunter-gatherer societies. These characteristics could enhance survival by promoting exploration, quick decision-making, and adaptability in changing environments. The "hunter versus farmer" theory posits that while such traits were advantageous for nomadic hunters, they became less suitable with the advent of sedentary agricultural societies, leading to conflicts with modern social structures and expectations.

Proponents of this view argue that ADHD behaviors are not inherently pathological but are mismatches between ancient adaptive traits and contemporary environments. This argument fits into larger idea of neurodiversity and encourages a re-evaluation of ADHD, promoting understanding and adaptation rather than solely focusing on symptom management. Some psychiatrists have even begun to cater to the evolutionary framework of ADHD.

Critics caution that evolutionary explanations may oversimplify the complex interplay of genetic, environmental, and neurodevelopmental factors that contribute to ADHD. They emphasize the importance of evidence-based approaches in diagnosis and treatment, arguing that while evolutionary theories provide interesting insights, they should not replace established scientific methodologies. This said, the enticing idea that ADHD was once advantageous is gaining coverage in media.

=== Autism spectrum disorder (ASD) ===
Autism spectrum disorder is characterized by difficulties with social interaction and communication, and restricted and repetitive behavior. In developed countries, about 2.8% of children (1 in 36) are diagnosed with ASD as of 2023, up from 0.7% in 2000 in the United States. Prevalence was likewise higher in 2017 data. It is diagnosed four-to-five times more often in males than females.

Autism differs widely between individuals (it is highly heterogenous) with different causes for different individuals. Some cases are caused by deleterious mutations or prenatal and neonatal trauma, for which no adaptive explanation is required. These cases are often associated with intellectual disability. Estimates range that between 5–20% of the autism spectrum can be explained by these dysfunctional processes, especially of genetics. However, other cases of autism are eligible for adaptive explanations. The fact that multiple explanations for autism exist causes conflict within the autism community, especially between proponents of the neurodiversity perspective and family members caring for individuals with ASD that have severe disabilities.

The idea of autism as conveying cognitive strengths has become steadily more popular since the film Rain Man and the recent growth of the neurodiversity and autism rights movements, although recognition of unusual autistic ability be found even in the early writings of Hans Asperger who called his autistic patients 'little professors'. It has been suggested by autistics such as Temple Grandin that autistic hunter-gatherer ancestors were important figures in the community, especially for their inventive capacity:

'Who do you think made the first stone spear? (...) That wasn't the yakkity yaks sitting around the campfire. It was some Asperger sitting in the back of a cave figuring out how to chip rocks into spearheads. Without some autistic traits you wouldn't even have a recording device to record this conversation on."

Leading autism researcher Simon Baron-Cohen has proposed that autism is an extreme systemising cognitive type, on an empathising-systemising spectrum which all people fall onto, somewhat related to the things-people dimension of interests. He has documented the exceptional talent of many autistic people in some area of non-human knowledge or skill. In his book, The Pattern Seekers: How Autism Drives Human Invention, he proposes a theory of human inventiveness that places autistic individuals as having extreme versions of these inventing (or systemising) traits.

Marco del Giudice has suggested that autistic-like traits in their non-pathological form contribute to a male-typical strategy geared toward high parental investment, low-mating effort, and long-term resource allocation. He has also related this to a slow life history strategy. This is based on the fact that autistics show lower interest in short-term mating, higher partner-specific investment, and stronger commitment to long-term romantic relations.

Bernard Crespi has suggested that autism is a disorder of high intelligence, noting that autism commonly involves enhanced, but imbalanced, components of intelligence. This hypothesis is supported by evidence showing that autism and high IQ share a diverse set of convergent correlates, including large brain size, fast brain growth, increased sensory and visual-spatial abilities, enhanced synaptic functions, increased attentional focus, high socioeconomic status, more deliberative decision-making, profession and occupational interests in engineering and physical sciences, and high levels of positive assortative mating. Recent evolutionary selection pressures for high intelligence in humans would therefore have conveyed greater risk of developing autism.

=== Antisocial personality disorder ===
Antisocial personality disorder (sometimes known as sociopathy or psychopathy), is characterised by deceitfulness, lack of empathy and guilt, impulsiveness, and antisocial behaviour. The prevalence of psychopathy is estimated to be around 1% in the general population and 20% in prison populations, with higher rates in North America than Europe. Psychopathy, narcissism and Machiavellianism are considered to be part of the Dark Triad, traits that are generally characterised by selfishness and low agreeableness.

Various evolutionary hypotheses have been proposed to explain psychopathy and the Dark Triad. Within an ancestral context, high self-interest and low levels of empathy could function as a short-term mating strategy. There is evidence that Dark Triad traits are positively correlated with the number of sexual partners, more unrestrictive sociosexuality and preference for short-term mates.

Glenn et al. stated two theories on how selection might allow for psychopathic traits. The first is as a fast life-history strategy, associated with less focusing on the future, high risk taking and short-term mating. The second is mutation-selection balance, with many common alleles of small effect selected against, which, when accumulated, can result in psychopathic behaviour, without any significant disruption of reproductive fitness.

Mealey's influential account states that psychopaths are designed for social deception and evolved to pursue manipulative life strategies or cheating strategies, (reflected in cheater-cooperation models of game theory). Cheating strategies are stable at low frequencies in the population, but will be detected and punished at higher frequencies. This frequency-dependent strategy would explain the prevalence of psychopathic traits in the population.

Mealey makes four statements about psychopathy:

1. There is a genetic predisposition for psychopathy, which is normally distributed in all populations.
2. A few individuals will be deemed "morally insane" in any culture, due to selection filling in this small and frequency-dependent niche.
3. Depending on environmental conditions, individuals who are less extreme on the continuum will pursue a similar cheating strategy.
4. An underlying genetic continuum of psychopathy is present in all of us, becoming apparent when antisocial strategies are more profitable in certain conditions.

Mealey also explains the higher male prevalence and predisposing environmental factors (low physical attractiveness, age, health, physical attractiveness, intelligence, socioeconomic status, and social skills) as signals that a cheating strategy is preferable, hence why these factors are associated with psychopathic traits.

=== Depression ===
Major depressive disorder (MDD) is characterized by at least two weeks of persistent low mood. It is accompanied by a wide variety of negative feelings such as low self-esteem, loss of interest in normally enjoyable activities and low energy. There are multiple possible evolutionary explanations for the occurrence of depression and low mood in humans. Many different hypotheses are not mutually exclusive. It has been suggested that different life events and other disease processes are responsible for different forms of depression with subtypes related to infection, long-term stress, loneliness, traumatic experience, hierarchy conflict, grief, romantic rejection, postpartum events, the season, chemicals, somatic diseases and starvation. It has been suggested that individualising care based on causational subtypes would lend direction in treatments. Other hypotheses include:

==== Social-oriented hypotheses ====
The social competition hypothesis (similarly to the social rank theory) interprets depression as an emotion of submission, an involuntary strategy to create a subjective sense of incapacity. Feelings of powerlessness or helplessness cause this incapacity, inhibiting aggression towards higher-ranked people and signalling submission. Low mood encourages acceptance of a loss in rank and promotes yielding. John Price endorsed this theory, noting that chickens who lose a fight withdraw from social engagement and act submissively, reducing further attacks by chickens higher in the hierarchy and avoiding being wounded or even killed.

Similar to the social competition hypothesis, the 'social risk hypothesis' states that depression prevents people from engaging in social interactions that might lead to them being ostracised. This hypothesis is inspired by risk-sensitive foraging. It suggests that people in successful social relationships can tolerate higher levels of social risk-taking, while on the other hand, people with low social standing cannot. The theory suggests that the low mood which accompanies MDD exists in order to reduce potential risk taking and encourages isolation in those individuals.

==== Psychic pain hypotheses ====
Depression is common in people who are pursuing unreachable goals and depression might be a manifestation, similarly to the social competition hypothesis, of a failure to yield. Low mood increases an organism's ability to cope with the adaptive challenges characteristic of unpropitious situations. Pessimism and lack of motivation may give a fitness advantage by inhibiting certain actions. When current life plans are not working, the distress and lack of motivation that characterize depression may motivate planning and reassessment or escape, even by suicide. Feelings of sadness and discouragement may be a useful stimulus to consider ways of changing the situation, by disengagement of motivation from an unreachable goal. In nature, it would make sense to decrease motivation in situations where taking action would be futile and therefore a waste of resources. Therefore, low mood in those situations would help the individual to preserve energy. This hypothesis is inspired by the marginal value theorem.

The 'analytical rumination' hypothesis is a refinement of the psychic pain hypothesis. It suggests that depressive symptoms are triggered by complex problems and an inability to find the correct course of action. This theory describes how this could lead to a loss of interest in virtually all activities in order to benefit the individual to single-mindedly focus on the problem at hand.

==== Cry-for-help and bargaining hypotheses ====
Depression, deliberate self-harm and suicide may be reactions to life circumstances that encourage others to provide resources and help to the depressed or suicidal individual. Group members, and especially family members, have a vested interest in keeping the depressed individual alive and changing their circumstances in such a way as to make them a functioning member of society again. It may be the case that certain life choices (e.g. marrying somebody who your parents dislike) may become possible only when depressed or suicidal behaviour is observed by the family or social group. This could explain various precipitating factors for depression. However, some research has found that signs of depression only lead to a short-term increase of care by family members, after which they tend to withdraw.

=== Eating disorders ===
Evolutionary perspectives exist on Anorexia nervosa (henceforth 'anorexia') and Bulimia nervosa (henceforth 'bulimia'). Anorexia is characterized by restriction of food intake, bulimia by cycles of binging (excessive eating) and purging (forced removal of the food). Both are associated with fear of weight gain, body image disturbance, and physical attractiveness concerns.

The Sexual Competition Hypothesis relates eating disorders to body shape and physical appearance as of adaptive function in human females (who are highly over-represented in eating disorders): eating disorders are supposed to increase female attractiveness. Some evidence from non-clinical and clinical populations support this hypothesis. These studies apply the framework of life-history theory, proposing that anorexia is a slow life history strategy whilst bulimia is a fast strategy. The studies had limitations and it was further mentioned that the deep structures of eating disorders may not be reflected by their current classifications.

An alternative account comes from Randolph M. Nesse. Based on evidence that many anorexia patients are neither actively chasing men nor particularly interested in sex, and that eating disorders became more common in the second half of the 20th century, he argues eating disorders are new problems with no redeeming features. They are caused by increasingly high concerns about appearance linked with the possibility in modern societies to compare someone's appearance to thousands of others instantly. Glorification of unrealistic body types in media, as well as increased availability of sex, may contribute to this. He does, however, agree that intra-sexual competition is a driving force of anorexia and bulimia in undergraduate women.

Obesity is not an eating disorder in any classification system, though it is established that being overweight and obese are connected with various diseases, and an evolutionary perspective can explain the tendency towards overeating. The human body has evolved to cope with the environments of scarcity, selecting for beneficial adaptations of hunger and eating. Fat storage allows preparation for future food shortages. In a case of mismatch, modern environments have cheap, readily available food, and very few times of scarcity. Kardum et al. also elaborated the differences in nutrient composition in modern and ancestral societies to illustrate the challenge modern diet imposes on the not-yet adapted human body and genotype.

=== Anxiety ===
Anxiety is a feeling of worry, unpleasantness and dread towards possible future events and exists to protect us from dangers. Next to normal anxiety there are multiple types of anxiety disorders which are all characterised by excessive fear and anxiety. These disorders include: specific phobias (e.g., agoraphobia), generalized anxiety disorder, social anxiety disorder, separation anxiety disorder, panic disorder, and selective mutism. In the US, anxiety disorders are the most common mental illness, with around 29% of adults expected to have any anxiety disorder in their lifetime. Women are disproportionately affected.

Evolutionary perspectives on anxiety disorders generally consider the adaptive function of the emotion of normal anxiety, and reasons this adaptive system may manifest in the various types of anxiety disorders.

A key evolutionary explanation for anxiety disorder is the Smoke Detector Principle. It is often preferable to overactivate anxiety in dangerous situations, in the same way a smoke detector is designed to overactivate. Randolph Nesse writes:

"You are thirsty on the ancient African savanna and a watering hole is just ahead, but you hear a noise in the grass. It could be a lion, or it might just be a monkey. Should you flee? It depends on the costs. Assume that fleeing in panic costs 100 calories. Not fleeing costs nothing if it is only a monkey, but if the noise was made by a lion, the cost is 100,000 calories – about how much energy a lion would get from having you for lunch!"

== Treatment ==
Evolutionary psychiatry has so far primarily concentrated on providing scientific explanations for mental disorders rather than developing novel treatment approaches. However, there are various consequences of taking an evolutionary perspective on mental disorder for treatment decisions, at an individual and public health level, which make evolutionary psychiatry an important field of future research and application.

Evolutionary explanations for disorders which reframe them as mismatched or otherwise costly adaptations may be taken to imply that treatment is unnecessary – but this is not the view of evolutionary psychiatrists – and is the same mistake made by those who believe evolutionary biology means endorsing eugenics, a version of the naturalistic fallacy – that what is natural (in this case, evolved) is good. Many medical interventions are 'unnatural' in this sense (e.g. contraception and anaesthetic). The explanations of evolutionary psychiatry have no inherent value in directing treatment. Randolph Nesse writes:

"On learning that low mood can be useful, some people conclude that it therefore should not be treated. This mistake is like the one that arose when anethesia was first invented: some doctors refused to use it, even during surgery, because, they said, pain is normal. We must not let new understanding of the utility of low mood interfere with our efforts to relieve mental pain."

Although evolutionary explanations may not affect the necessity for treatment, they can be directive or supportive of treatment, or make current treatment strategies more effective. Proposed benefits of taking an evolutionary perspective on mental disorders have largely come from integrating evolutionary explanations into psychotherapy. Bailey and Gilbert write:

"The evolutionary approach helps to answer three fundamental questions about humanity that go to the heart of professional helping and clinical practice: First, what and who are we as human beings – that is, what is human nature or species 'normality'?; second, how and why do humans develop and/or behave in less than optimal ways – that is, what can evolution tell us about the causes of suffering and psychopathology?; and, third, what can professional helpers and psychotherapists do to ameliorate or even 'cure' the suffering of heart and mind?"

It has been suggested that patients are encouraged and destigmatised by hearing evolutionary explanations for their conditions, with positive effects during cognitive behavioural therapy – integration of knowledge of behavioural genetics, neuroscience and evolutionary psychiatry into psychotherapy has been called 'Informed Cognitive Therapy' by Mike Abrams. Abrams also proposes that recognising the inherited and somewhat immutable nature of certain traits (such as psychopathy and autism) implies that therapists should not try and alter the traits characteristics, but instead provide advice on how to best utilise these cognitive types within the context of modern society. This aligns with the aims and claims of the neurodiversity movement.

Evolutionary explanations for mental disorders, especially of mismatch, have connotations for public health measures and organisational psychology. Disorders which are consequences of novel environments may be rectified or prevented by implementing social structures which better replicate ancestral environments. For example, postpartum depression may be more likely in modern environments where single parents are given sole responsibility in raising a child, which is highly unusual in the context of an evolutionary history of alloparenting and communal care. Reversing this mismatch, social services supporting new mothers in parenting may prevent postpartum depression (see Evolutionary approaches to postpartum depression). Education and employment environments which are particularly likely to cause mental disorders may also be altered to better suit natural human psychological capacities.

Beyond informing existing protocols, evolutionary principles have driven the direct development of dedicated evolutionarily informed psychotherapy frameworks. Interventions such as Compassion-Focused Therapy (CFT) and Evolutionary Systems Therapy (EST) are explicitly grounded in evolutionary theory from their inception, integrating evolutionary models into both case conceptualization and treatment structures. Conversely, other established modalities—such as cognitive-behavioral therapy (CBT) for anxiety—have increasingly incorporated evolutionarily informed models and behavioral genetics findings to refine their treatment targets and enhance clinical efficacy.

== Methodology and evidence synthesis ==
A recent contribution to the field is the DCIDE framework, developed to improve the systematic evaluation of evolutionary hypotheses in psychiatry by structuring evidence synthesis across disciplines (e.g. genetic, neuroscientific, epidemiological). The framework aims to mitigate issues of speculative narratives by requiring transparent linkage of proximate mechanisms to evolutionary function and acknowledging alternative hypotheses.

Its adoption may help evolutionary psychiatry align more closely with standards of evidence used in biological psychiatry and evolutionary medicine.
