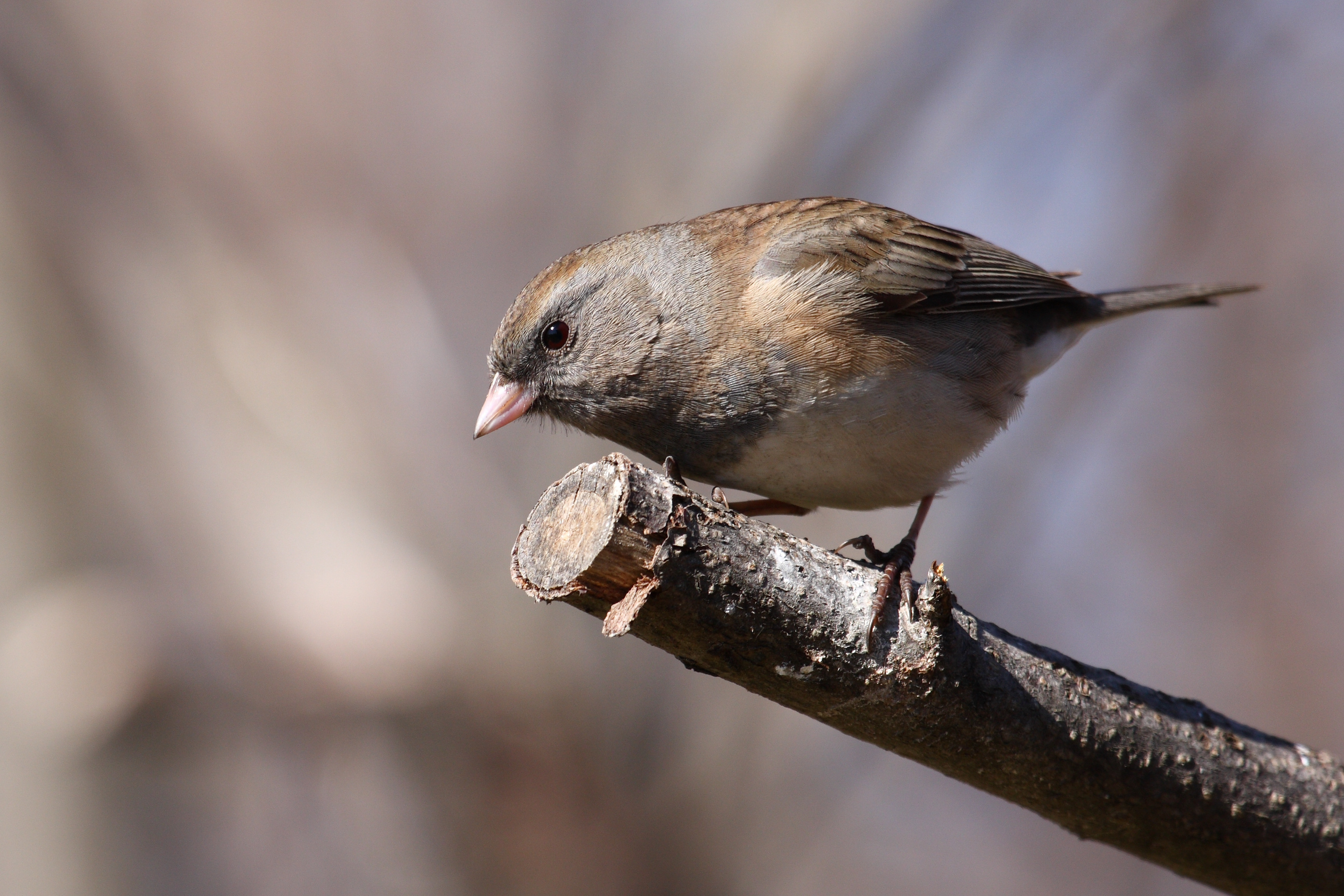
- Slate-colored dark-eyed junco (Junco hyemalis hyemalis) female, Cap Tourmente National Wildlife Area, Quebec, Canada

Scientific classification
- Kingdom: Animalia
- Phylum: Chordata
- Class: Aves
- Order: Passeriformes
- Family: Passerellidae
- Genus: Junco; Wagler, 1831

Type species
- Junco phaeonotus (yellow-eyed junco) Wagler, 1831

Species
- Junco hyemalis; Junco insularis; Junco phaeonotus; Junco bairdi; Junco vulcani; (See text)

= Junco =

Juncos

Genus of birds

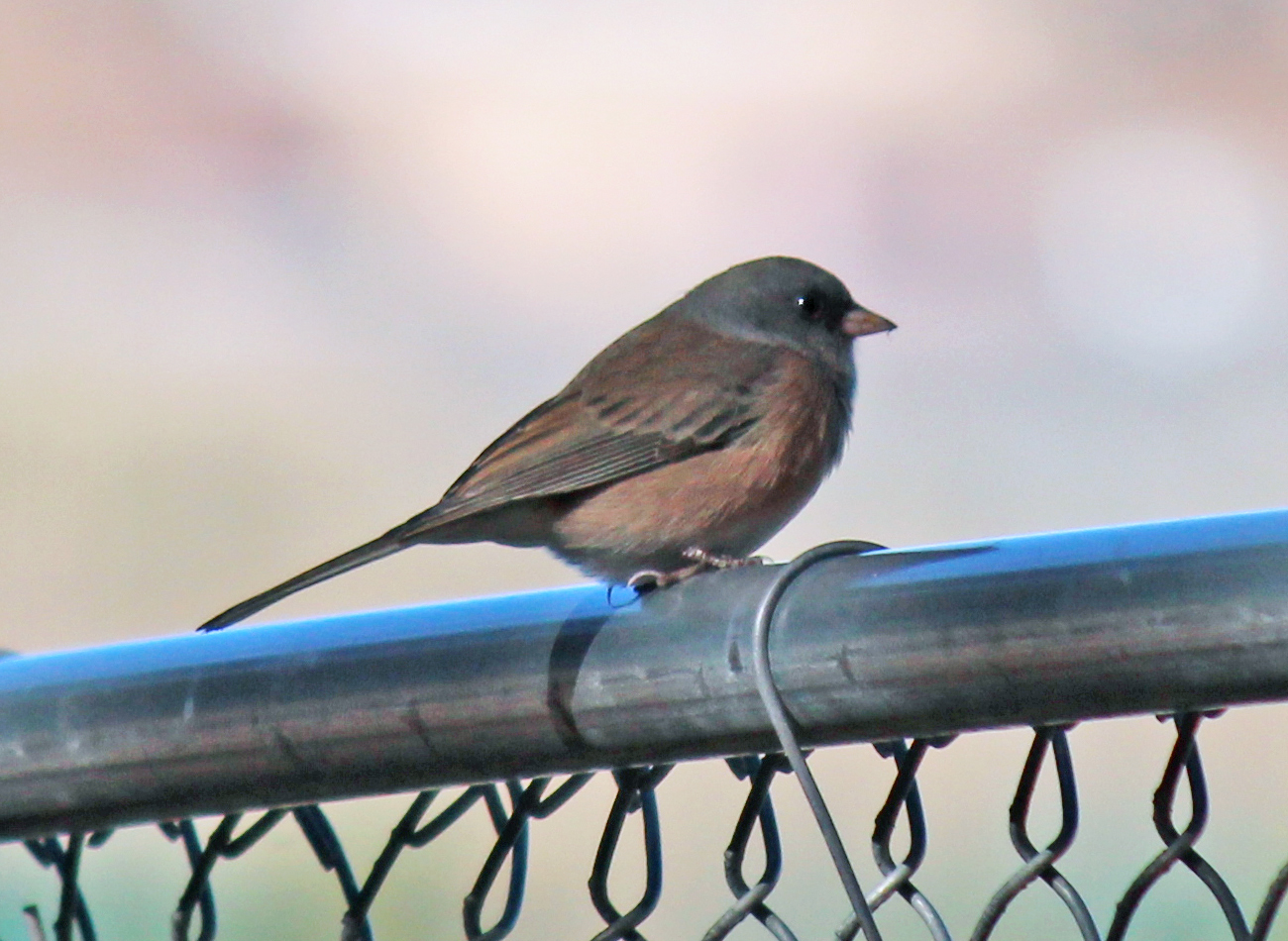
A pink-sided dark-eyed junco in Elizabeth, Colorado

A junco (/ˈdʒʌŋkoʊ/ JUNG-koh), genus Junco, is a small North American bird in the New World sparrow family Passerellidae. Junco systematics are still confusing after decades of research, with various authors accepting between three and twelve species. Despite having a name that appears to derive from the Spanish term for the plant genus Juncus (rushes), these birds are seldom found among rush plants, which prefer wet ground, while juncos prefer dry soil.

Their breeding habitat is coniferous or mixed forest areas throughout North America, ranging from subarctic taiga to high-altitude mountain forests in Mexico and Central America south to Panama. Northern birds usually migrate farther south; southern populations are permanent residents or altitudinal migrants, moving only a short distance downslope to avoid severe winter weather in the mountains.

These birds forage on the ground. In winter, they often forage in flocks. They eat mainly insects and seeds. They usually nest in a well-hidden location on the ground or low in a shrub or tree.

== Taxonomy ==
The genus Junco was introduced in 1831 by the German naturalist Johann Georg Wagler for a single species, the yellow-eyed junco. The yellow-eyed junco is therefore now the type species. The genus name is from Latin iuncus meaning 'rush'.

The genus contains five species:

Genus Junco – Wagler, 1831 – five species
Common name	Scientific name and subspecies	Range	Size and ecology	IUCN status and estimated population
dark-eyed junco	Junco hyemalis (Linnaeus, 1758)	temperate North America	Size: Habitat: Diet:	LC
Guadalupe junco	Junco insularis Ridgway, 1876	once the entirety of Guadalupe Island, now restricted to the northern part	Size: Habitat: Diet:	EN
yellow-eyed junco	Junco phaeonotus (Wagler, 1831)	Map of range	Size: Habitat: Diet:	LC
Baird's junco	Junco bairdi (Ridgway, 1883)	Sierra de la Laguna (southern Baja California peninsula, Mexico)	Size: Habitat: Diet:	NT
volcano junco	Junco vulcani (Boucard, 1878)	Costa Rica and western Panama	Size: Habitat: Diet:	LC
