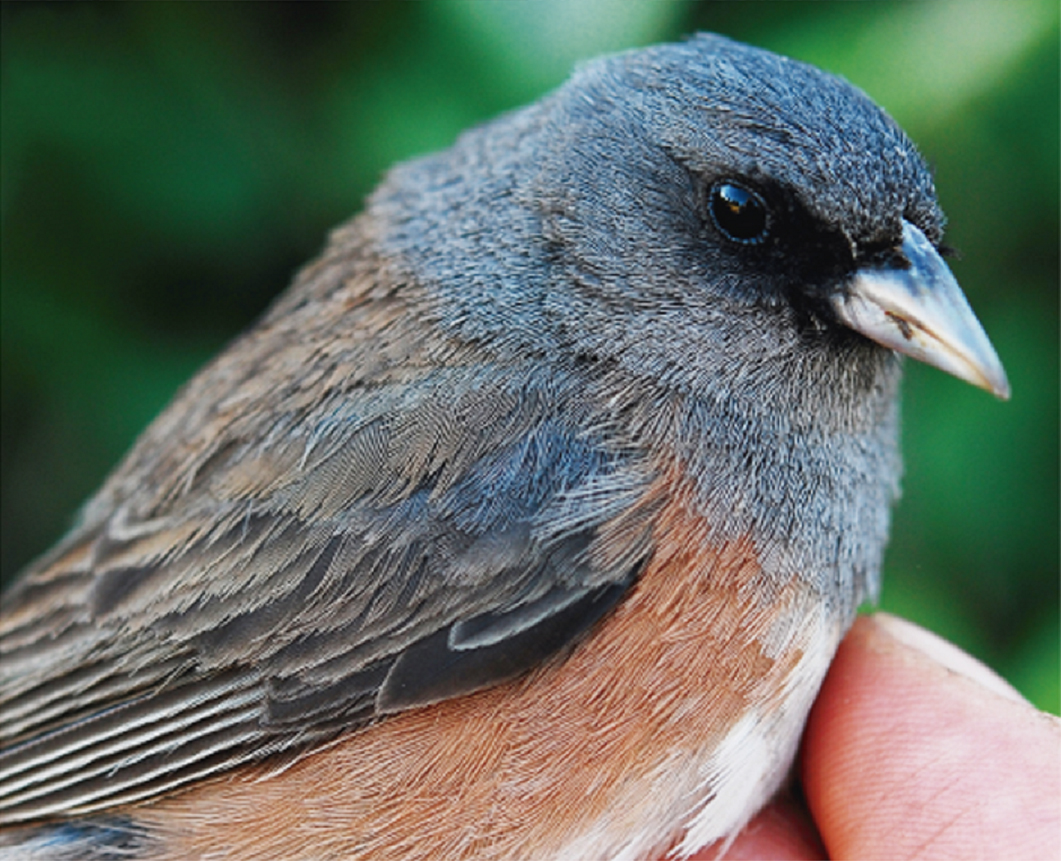

Conservation status
- Vulnerable (IUCN 3.1)

Scientific classification
- Kingdom: Animalia
- Phylum: Chordata
- Class: Aves
- Order: Passeriformes
- Family: Passerellidae
- Genus: Junco
- Species: J. insularis

Binomial name
- Junco insularis Ridgway, 1876

Synonyms
- Junco hyemalis insularis Ridgway, 1876

= Guadalupe junco =

Species of bird

The Guadalupe junco (Junco insularis) is a small bird in the New World sparrow family that is endemic to Guadalupe Island off the western coast of Baja California, Mexico. Many taxonomic authorities classified it in 2008 as a subspecies of the dark-eyed junco (Junco hyemalis). In 2016, it was re-classified as a full species.

== Description and ecology ==
The Guadalupe junco has a dull grayish head with a gray bill and brownish upperparts. Its wings and tail are blackish, though the tail has white edges. Its underparts are white with a rufous fringe at the bottom of the wings. It makes a high, sharp sik and a long series of chipping notes.

This bird is today found mainly in the Guadalupe cypress (Cupressus guadalupensis) groves on Guadalupe Island, with a few birds in the remaining Monterey pine (Pinus radiata) stands. Around 1900, it was known to utilize almost any habitat for breeding. It ranged over the whole island for feeding then, and indeed still does theoretically, but actually only a handful of flocks exist, mostly in the northern part of the island. A testimony to the adaptability of this species is the fact that, today, a few birds breed at the seashore in non-native tree tobacco (Nicotiana glauca) shrubs, since this is dense enough to provide some protection from feral cats.

The breeding season is from February to June. Three to four eggs are laid in a bulky cup nest of dried grass stems, which is either in a depression in the ground or in the lower branches of a tree. The eggs are greenish-white with reddish-brown spots. If food is plentiful, the birds apparently breed twice a year.

== Decline to near-extinction ==
This bird used to be abundant, but now only 50 to 100 adult birds are thought to survive, mostly in the northern part of the island. Domestic goats (Capra hircus) that were introduced to the island to provide food for fishermen and to start a meat canning plant in the early to mid-19th century became feral, multiplied and overran it by the late 19th century, with more than four goats per hectare (nearly two per acre) being present around the 1870s. Domestic cats (Felis catus) that were introduced to the island next also became feral, multiplied and overran it and as the habitat was destroyed by the feral goats, the endemic wildlife was destroyed by the feral cats. In 1897, Kaeding found the Guadalupe junco "abundant", but already decreasing due to feral cat predation. Anthony summed up 10 years of occasional visits in 1901 by noting that "...the juncos are slowly but surely becoming scarce." He blamed the interaction of the feral goats destroying the habitat and the feral cats destroying the birds themselves.

Wilmot W. Brown Jr., H. W. Marsden and Ignacio Oroso surveyed Guadalupe throughout May and June 1906, and collected numerous bird specimens for the Thayer Museum – among these a "large series" of the Guadalupe junco. They found the Guadalupe junco "fairly abundant" but, despite the depredations of the feral cats, still "a very tame, confiding little bird" – in other words, unwary of predators.

The feral goats were extirpated from the island by 2006 by the Grupo de Ecologia y Conservacion de Islas and Island Conservation, permitting a spectacular regeneration of the native flora. The island was recently protected as a biosphere reserve, again by the above groups. As the habitat regenerates and, especially, if the planned containment (at the least) or extirpation (at the most) of the feral cats will be undertaken, the remaining Guadalupe juncos will surely find more protected breeding and feeding sites. Indeed, the future of the Guadalupe junco looks better than it did during the 20th century, although it is still precariously close to extinction and could be wiped out by any chance event, such as a violent storm or an introduced disease. On the IUCN Red List, it was classified as Endangered when the Guadalupe junco was recognized as its own species in 2016. However, in 2025, it was downlisted to Vulnerable
