= Randolph M. Nesse =

American physician, scientist and author (born 1948)

Randolph Martin Nesse
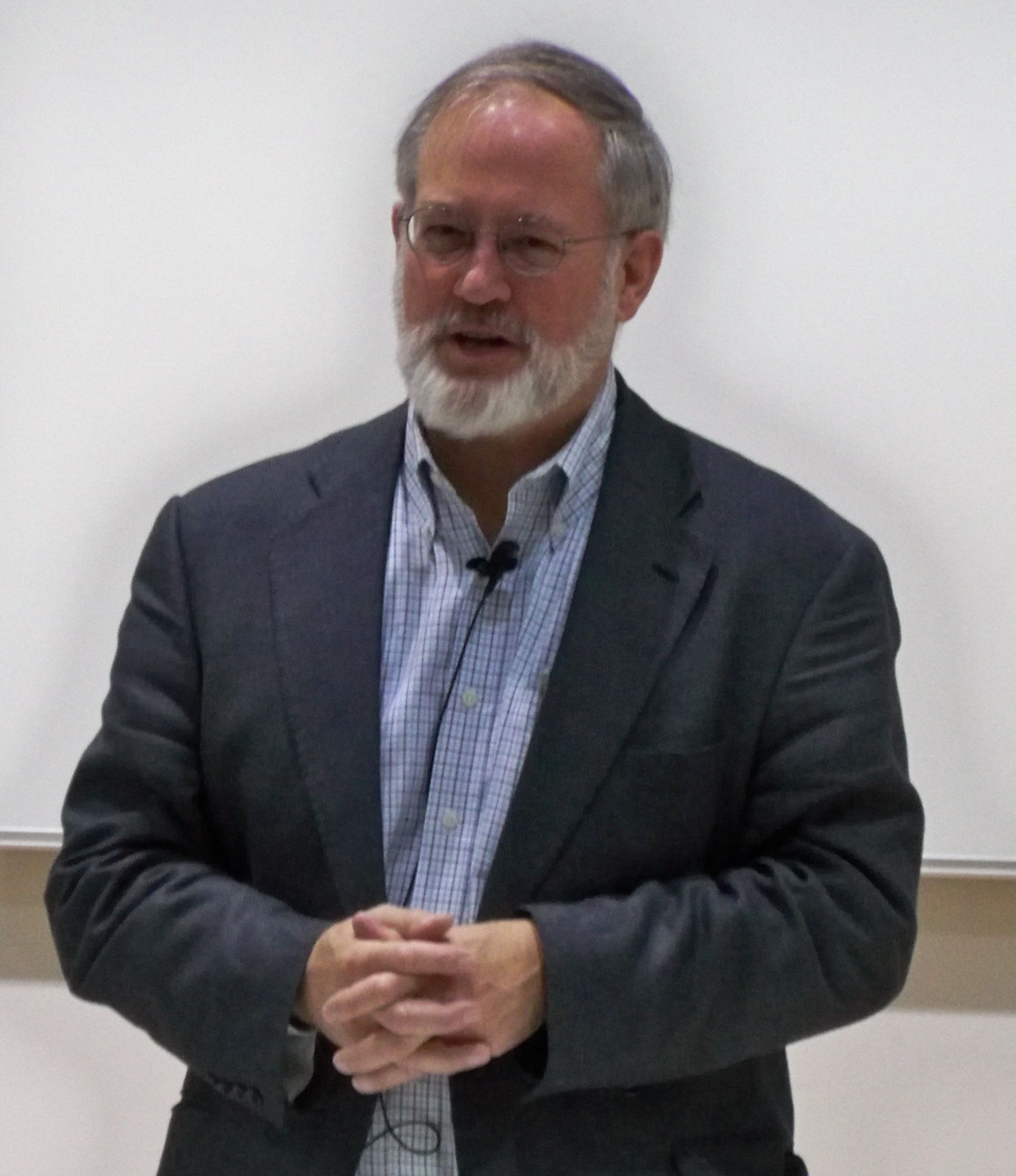
- Born: July 10, 1948 (age 78)
- Education: Carleton College; University of Michigan
- Known for: evolutionary medicine evolutionary psychiatry
- Scientific career
- Workplaces: University of Michigan; Arizona State University
- Doctoral students: Matthew C. Keller
- Website: www.randolphnesse.com

Randolph Martin Nesse (born July 10, 1948) is an American physician, scientist and author who is notable for his role as a founder of the field of evolutionary medicine and evolutionary psychiatry.

== Education and career ==
Nesse studied at Carleton College from 1966 to 1970. He went on to receive his M.D. at the University of Michigan Medical School in 1974 and carried out his medical residency at the same place. Nesse became an instructor in psychiatry at the University of Michigan in 1977 and became an assistant professor there in psychiatry in 1979. He became associate professor in psychiatry in 1985 and professor in psychiatry in 1993 at University of Michigan, where he was also a professor of psychology since 2001. Nesse became professor emeritus at Michigan at the end of 2013.

Since 2014, Nesse became professor of life sciences and ASU Foundation Professor at Arizona State University, where he became the Founding Director of the Center for Evolution and Medicine. He was previously a professor of psychiatry, professor of psychology and research professor at the University of Michigan where he led the Evolution and Human Adaptation Program and helped to establish one of the world's first anxiety disorders clinics and conducted research on neuroendocrine responses to fear.

== Research ==
Nesse's research on the evolution of aging led to a long collaboration with the evolutionary biologist George C. Williams. Their co-authored book, Why We Get Sick: The New Science of Darwinian Medicine, inspired fast growth of the field of evolutionary medicine. His subsequent research has focused on how natural selection shapes mechanisms that regulate pain, fever, anxiety, low mood, and why emotional disorders are so common. He also has written extensively about the evolutionary origins of moral emotions, and strategies for establishing evolutionary biology as a basic science for medicine. Good Reasons for Bad Feelings: Insights from the Frontier of Evolutionary Psychiatry applies the principles of evolutionary medicine to mental disorders.

Nesse was the initial organizer and second president of the Human Behavior and Evolution Society, and is currently the president of the International Society for Evolution, Medicine & Public Health. He is a Distinguished Life Fellow of the American Psychiatric Association, a Fellow of the Association for Psychological Science, and an elected Fellow of the AAAS.

== Bibliography ==
=== Books and chapters ===
- Nesse, R. M., & Williams, G. C. (1995). Why We Get Sick. New York: Times Books.
- Nesse, R. M. (1999). "Testing evolutionary hypotheses about mental disorders." In S. Stearns (Ed.), Evolution in Health and Disease (pp. 260–266). New York: Oxford University Press.
- Nesse, R. M., & Williams, G. C. (1999). "Research designs that address evolutionary questions about medical disorders." In S. Stearns (Ed.), Evolution in Health and Disease (pp. 16–26). New York: Oxford University Press.
- "Is the market on Prozac?", February 28, 2000 Stanford University Press
- Nesse, Randolph M (Ed.). (2001). Evolution and the capacity for commitment. New York: Russell Sage Foundation.
- Nesse, Randolph M, & Dawkins, R. (2010). Evolution: Medicine's most basic science. In D. A. Warrell, T. M. Cox, J. D. Firth, & E. J. J. Benz (Eds.), Oxford Textbook of Medicine, 5th edition (pp. 12–15). Oxford: Oxford University Press.

=== Awards ===
2025 – Friend of Darwin award, National Center for Science Education

=== Papers ===
- Williams G. C., Nesse R. M. (1991). "The dawn of Darwinian medicine". Quarterly Review of Biology. 66 (1): 1–22. doi:10.1086/417048. JSTOR 2830330. PMID 2052670. S2CID 40357032.
- Nesse R (1997), "An evolutionary perspective on panic disorder and agoraphobia", in Baron-Cohen S (ed.), The maladapted mind: classic readings in evolutionary psychopathology, East Sussex: Psychology Press, pp. 73–83, ISBN 0-86377-460-1
- Nesse R; Williams, G.C (1997), "Are mental disorders diseases?", in Baron-Cohen S (ed.), The maladapted mind: classic readings in evolutionary psychopathology, East Sussex: Psychology Press, pp. 1–22, ISBN 0-86377-460-1
- Nesse R. M. (2000). "Is Depression an Adaptation?" (PDF). Arch Gen Psychiatry. 57 (1): 14–20. doi:10.1001/archpsyc.57.1.14. PMID 10632228. Archived from the original (PDF) on 2020-11-09.
- Keller M.C., Nesse R.M. (2005). "Is low mood an adaptation? Evidence for subtypes with symptoms that match precipitants" (PDF). Journal of Affective Disorders. 86 (1): 27–35. doi:10.1016/j.jad.2004.12.005. PMID 15820268. Archived from the original (PDF) on 2020-11-09.
- Marks I. M., Nesse R. M. (1994). "Fear and fitness: An evolutionary analysis of anxiety disorders". Ethology and Sociobiology. 15 (5–6): 247–261. doi:10.1016/0162-3095(94)90002-7. hdl:2027.42/31354.
- Nesse, R.M.; Bhatnagar, S.; Ellis, B. (2016). "Evolutionary Origins and Functions of the Stress Response System". Stress: Concepts, Cognition, Emotion, and Behavior. pp. 95–101. doi:10.1016/B978-0-12-800951-2.00011-X. ISBN 9780128009512.
- Nesse Randolph M (1990). "Evolutionary explanations of emotions". Human Nature. 1 (3): 261–289. doi:10.1007/bf02733986. PMID 24222085. S2CID 6521715.
- Nesse Randolph M (2004). "Natural selection and the elusiveness of happiness". Philosophical Transactions of the Royal Society of London. Series B, Biological Sciences. 359 (1449): 1333–1347. doi:10.1098/rstb.2004.1511. PMC 1693419. PMID 15347525.
- Nesse Randolph M (2005). "Natural Selection and the Regulation of Defenses: A Signal Detection Analysis of the Smoke Detector Principle". Evolution and Human Behavior. 26 (1): 88–105. Bibcode:2005EHumB..26...88N. doi:10.1016/j.evolhumbehav.2004.08.002.
- Nesse Randolph M (2013). "Tinbergen's four questions, organized: a response to Bateson and Laland". Trends in Ecology & Evolution. 28 (12): 681–682. Bibcode:2013TEcoE..28..681N. doi:10.1016/j.tree.2013.10.008. PMID 24216179.
- Nesse Randolph M, Berridge (1997). "Psychoactive drug use in evolutionary perspective". Science. 278 (5335): 63–66. doi:10.1126/science.278.5335.63. PMID 9311928.
- Nesse Randolph M., Finch C. E., Nunn C. L. (2017). "Does selection for short sleep duration explain human vulnerability to Alzheimer's disease?". Evolution, Medicine, and Public Health. 2017 (1): 39–46. doi:10.1093/emph/eow035. PMC 5381352. PMID 28096295.
- Nesse Randolph M., Stearns S. C. (2008). "The great opportunity: Evolutionary applications to medicine and public health: Evolutionary applications to medicine and public health". Evolutionary Applications. 1 (1): 28–48. doi:10.1111/j.1752-4571.2007.00006.x. PMC 3352398. PMID 25567489.
