= Matthew C. Keller =

American behavioral and psychiatric geneticist

- Education: University of Texas at Austin; University of Michigan
- Scientific career
- Fields: Behavioral genetics
- Institutions: University of Colorado Boulder
- Thesis: Natural selection and the manifestations of low mood and depression (2004)
- Doctoral advisor: Randolph M. Nesse
- Website: www.matthewckeller.com

Matthew C. Keller is an American behavioral and psychiatric geneticist. He is the Director of the Institute for Behavioral Genetics and a professor in the Department of Psychology and Neuroscience at the University of Colorado Boulder. He is known for his criticism of the candidate gene approach and for development of approaches in quantitative genetics.
