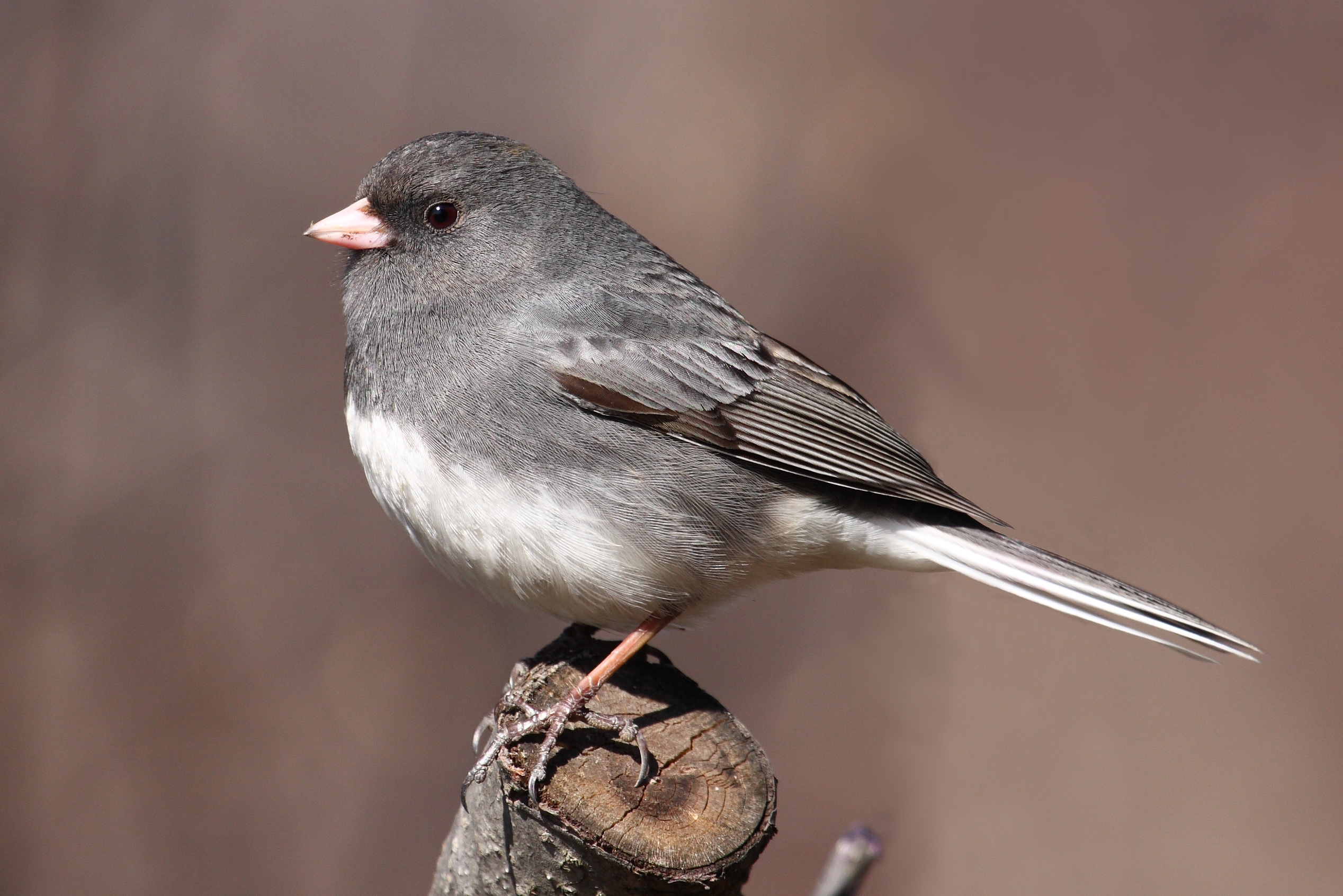
- Male J. h. hyemalis, in Quebec.

Conservation status
- Least Concern (IUCN 3.1)

Scientific classification
- Kingdom: Animalia
- Phylum: Chordata
- Class: Aves
- Order: Passeriformes
- Family: Passerellidae
- Genus: Junco
- Species: J. hyemalis

Binomial name
- Junco hyemalis (Linnaeus, 1758)
- Range in North America Breeding range Year-round range Wintering range

Synonyms
- List: Fringilla hyemalis Linnaeus, 1758; Emeriza hyemalis Linnaeus, 1766; Junco aikeni Ridgway, 1873; Junco caniceps (Woodhouse, 1853); Junco dorsalis Henry, 1858; Junco insularis Ridgway, 1876; Junco oreganus (Townsend, 1837) (but see text)

= Dark-eyed junco =

Species of bird

The dark-eyed junco (Junco hyemalis) is a species of junco, a group of small, grayish New World sparrows. The species is common across much of temperate North America and in summer it ranges far into the Arctic. It is a variable species, much like the related fox sparrow (Passerella iliaca), and its systematics are still not completely resolved.

== Taxonomy ==
The dark-eyed junco was formally described by the Swedish naturalist Carl Linnaeus in his landmark 1758 10th edition of Systema Naturae as Fringilla hyemalis. The description consisted merely of the laconic remark "F[ringilla] nigra, ventre albo. ("A black 'finch' with white belly") and a statement that it came from America. Linnaeus based his description on the "Snow-Bird" that Mark Catesby had described and illustrated in his 1731 The Natural History of Carolina, Florida and the Bahama Islands.

The Bill of this Bird is white: The Breast and Belly white. All the rest of the Body dark grey; but in some places black, inclining to Lead-color. In Virginia and Carolina they appear only in Winter: and in Snow they appear most. In Summer none are seen. Whether they retire and breed in the North (which is most probable) or where they go, when they leave these Countries in Spring, is to me unknown. [italics in original]

The type locality was restricted to South Carolina by the American Ornithologists' Union in 1931. The dark-eyed junco is now placed in the genus Junco that was introduced in 1831 by the German naturalist Johann Georg Wagler. The genus name Junco is the Spanish word for rush, from the Latin word juncus. Its modern scientific name means "winter junco", from the Latin word hyemalis "of the winter".

The extremely rare Guadalupe junco (Junco insularis) was formerly considered to be a subspecies of this species (either included in the gray-headed group or placed in a seventh group of its own, the Guadalupe group), but is now treated as a separate species in its own right – perhaps a rather young one, but certainly this population has evolved more rapidly than the 14 or 15 subspecies of the dark-eyed junco on the mainland due to its small population size and the founder effect.

=== Subspecies ===
Either 14 or 15 subspecies are recognized. These subspecies are grouped in two or three large or polytypic groups and three or four small or monotypic ones, all depending on the authority. These groups were formerly considered separate species, but they interbreed extensively in areas of contact. Birders trying to identify subspecies are advised to consult detailed identification references.

Slate-colored group
Image	Subspecies	Common name	Distribution
	J. h. hyemalis	Slate-colored dark-eyed junco	Alaska, across Canada from Newfoundland and Labrador to British Columbia, northeast U.S. from Massachusetts to Minnesota, northwest Mexico from Baja California to Chihuahua, and Gulf Coast states
	J. h. carolinensis	Carolina dark-eyed junco	Appalachian Mountains from northwest West Virginia and western Maryland south to northern Georgia
	J. h. cismontanus	Cassiar dark-eyed junco	Yukon, British Columbia, and Alberta south through Great Plains down toward north-central Mexico

* J. h. cismontanus is possibly a J. h. hyemalis x J. h. oreganus hybrid

These two or three subspecies have dark slate-gray heads, breasts and upperparts. Females are brownish-gray, sometimes with reddish-brown flanks.

They breed in the North American boreal forests from Alaska to Newfoundland and south to the Appalachian Mountains, wintering throughout most of the United States. They are relatively common across their range.

White-winged group
Image	Subspecies	Common name	Distribution
	J. h. aikeni	white-winged dark-eyed junco	a common endemic breeder in the Black Hills of South Dakota, Wyoming, Nebraska, and Montana, and winters south to northeastern New Mexico

This subspecies has a medium-gray head, breast, and upperparts with white wing bars. Females are washed brownish. It has more white in the tail than the other 14 subspecies.

Oregon or brown-backed group
Image	Subspecies	Common name	Distribution
	J. h. montanus	Montana dark-eyed junco	Interior British Columbia, Alberta, eastern Washington, northeast Oregon, Idaho, Montana, & Wyoming
	J. h. mutabilis	Nevada dark-eyed junco	Great Basin
	J. h. oreganus	Oregon dark-eyed junco	Coastal southeast Alaska to central British Columbia
	J. h. pinosus	Point Pinos dark-eyed junco	Coastal California (Santa Barbara to Del Norte County)
	J. h. pontilis	Laguna Hanson dark-eyed junco	Mountains of northern Baja California (Sierra Juarez)
	J. h. shufeldti	Shufeldt's dark-eyed junco	West slopes of coastal mountains from western Oregon to southwest British Columbia
	J. h. thurberi	Thurber's dark-eyed junco	Interior California (San Bernardino to Modoc County)
	J. h. townsendi	Townsend's dark-eyed junco	Mountains of northern Baja California (San Pedro Martir)

These eight subspecies have blackish-gray heads and breasts with brown backs and wings and reddish flanks, tending toward duller and paler plumage in the inland and southern parts of its range.

Oregon dark-eyed juncos are also less commonly known as brown-backed dark-eyed juncos. This is the most common subspecies group in the West, breeding in the Pacific Coast Ranges from southeastern Alaska to extreme northern Baja California and wintering to the Great Plains and northern Sonora. An unresolved debate exists as to whether this large and distinct subspecies group is actually a separate species with eight (or nine, see below) subspecies of its own.

Pink-sided group
Image	Subspecies	Common name	Distribution
	J. h. mearnsi	pink-sided dark-eyed junco	Breeds in the northern Rocky Mountains from southern Alberta to eastern Idaho and western Wyoming, winters in central Idaho and nearby Montana and from southwestern South Dakota, southern Wyoming, and northern Utah to northern Sonora and Chihuahua.

Sometimes considered a ninth subspecies in the Oregon/brown-backed group, this subspecies has a lighter gray head and breast than the eight Oregon/brown-backed dark-eyed juncos, with contrasting dark lores. The back and wings are brown. It has a pinkish-cinnamon color that is richer and covers more of the flanks and breast than in the eight Oregon/brown-backed dark-eyed juncos.

Gray-headed group
Image	Subspecies	Common name	Distribution
	J. h. caniceps	gray-headed dark-eyed junco	Breeds in the southern Rocky Mountains from Colorado to central Arizona and New Mexico, and winters into northern Mexico

This subspecies is essentially rather light gray on top with a rusty back.

Red-backed group
Image	Subspecies	Common name	Distribution
	J. h. dorsalis	red-backed dark-eyed junco	Southern mountains of Arizona and New Mexico.

Sometimes included with the gray-headed dark-eyed junco proper as part of the gray-headed group, this subspecies differs from it in having a more silvery bill with a dark-colored upper mandible and a light-colored lower mandible, a variable amount of rust on the wings, and pale underparts. This makes it similar to the yellow-eyed junco (Junco phaeonotus), except for the dark eyes. It does not overlap with the yellow-eyed junco in its breeding range.

== Description ==
Adult dark-eyed juncos generally have gray heads, necks, and breasts, gray or brown backs and wings, and a white belly, but show a confusing amount of variation in plumage details. The white outer tail feathers flash distinctively in flight and while hopping on the ground. The bill is usually pale pinkish.Males tend to have darker, more conspicuous markings than females. The dark-eyed junco is 13 to 17.5 cm (5.1 to 6.9 in) long and has a wingspan of 18 to 25 cm (7.1 to 9.8 in). Body mass can vary from 18 to 30 g (0.63 to 1.06 oz). Among standard measurements, the wing chord is 6.6 to 9.3 cm (2.6 to 3.7 in), the tail is 6.1 to 7.3 cm (2.4 to 2.9 in), the bill is 0.9 to 1.3 cm (0.35 to 0.51 in) and the tarsus is 1.9 to 2.3 cm (0.75 to 0.91 in). Juveniles often have pale streaks on their underparts and may even be mistaken for vesper sparrows (Pooecetes gramineus) until they acquire adult plumage at two to three months, but dark-eyed junco fledglings' heads are generally quite uniform in color already, and initially their bills still have conspicuous yellowish edges to the gape, remains of the fleshy wattles that guide the parents when they feed the nestlings. The song is a trill similar to the chipping sparrow's (Spizella passerina), except that the red-backed dark-eyed junco's (see above) song is more complex, similar to that of the yellow-eyed junco (Junco phaeonotus). The call also resembles that of the black-throated blue warbler (Setophaga caerulescens) which is a member of the New World warbler family. Calls include tick sounds and very high-pitched tinkling chips. It is known among bird song practitioners as an excellent bird to study for learning "bird language".

== Distribution and habitat ==
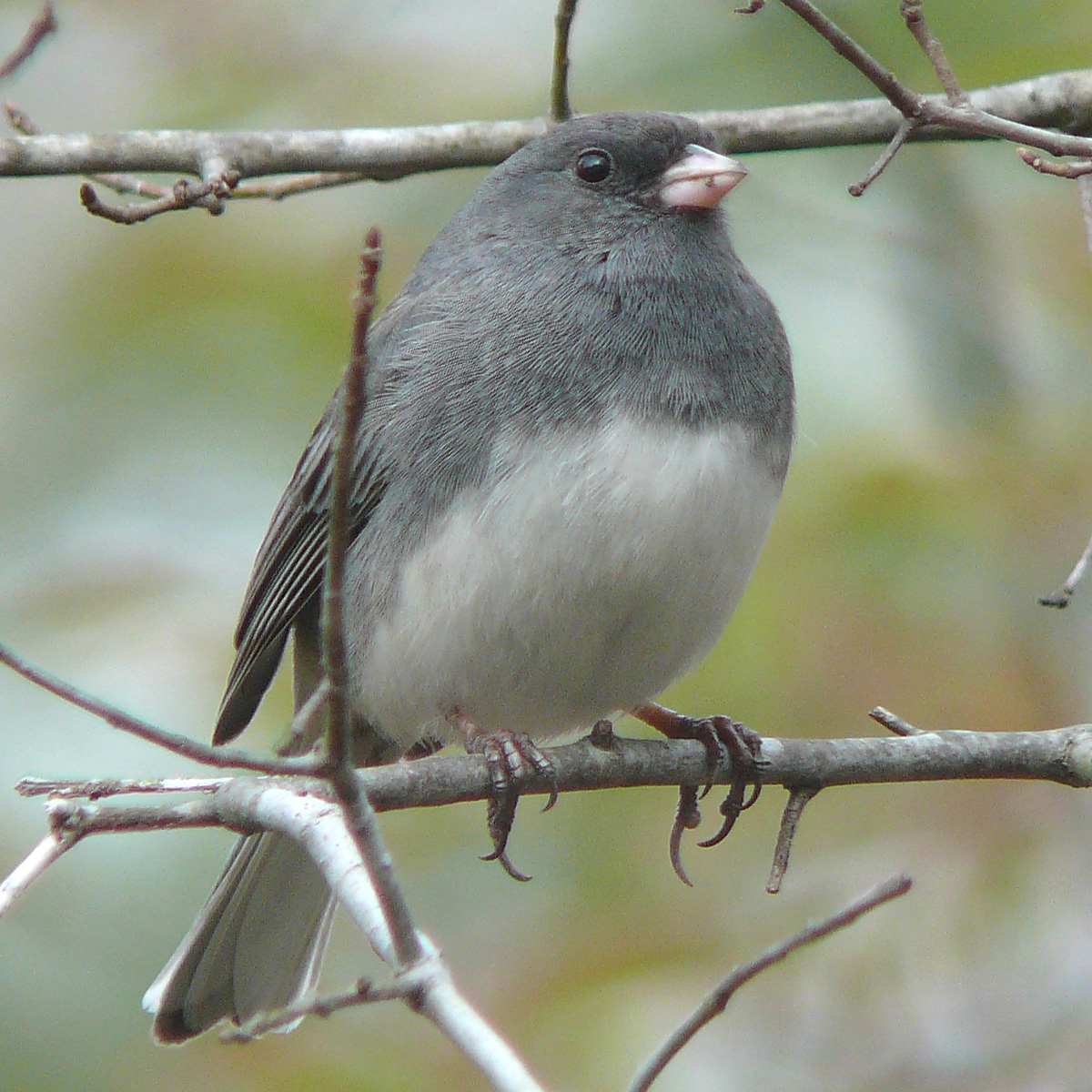
Male slate-colored dark-eyed junco (J. h. hyemalis), North Carolina

The dark-eyed junco's breeding habitat is coniferous or mixed forest areas throughout North America. In otherwise optimal conditions it also utilizes other habitats, but at the southern margin of its range it can only persist in its favorite habitat. Northern birds migrate further south, arriving in their winter quarters between mid-September and November and leaving to breed from mid-March onwards, with almost all of them gone by the end of April or so. Many populations are permanent residents or altitudinal migrants, while in cold years they may choose to stay in their winter range and breed there. For example, in the Sierra Nevada Mountains of eastern California, J. hyemalis populations will migrate to winter ranges 5,000–7,000 feet (1,500–2,100 m) lower than their summer range. Seasonally sympatric females show difference in migration and reproductive timing that is dependent on hormone and ovary regulation. The migrant female J. hyemails experience delayed growth in the gonad to allow time for their seasonal migration. They then migrate down to the northeastern United States, where the resident subspecies is the Carolina dark-eyed junco (J. h. carolinensis). Female Carolina dark-eyed juncos have large ovaries and, therefore, do not experience gonadal growth delays because they are residents in the area. In winter, dark-eyed juncos are familiar in and around towns, and in many places are the most common birds at feeders. The slate-colored dark-eyed junco (J. h. hyemalis) is a rare vagrant to Western Europe and may successfully winter in Great Britain, usually in domestic gardens.

== Behavior and ecology ==
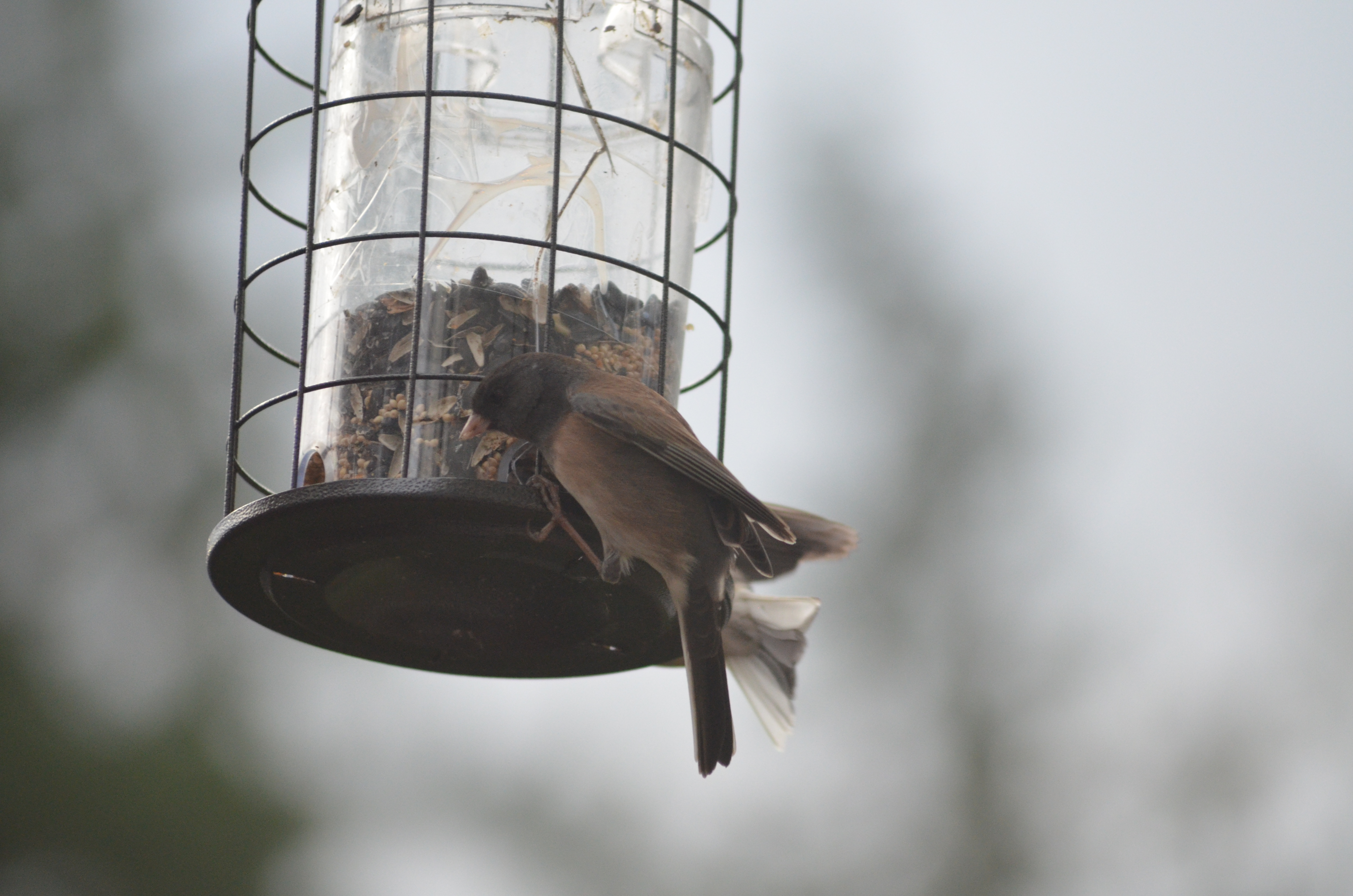
At a bird feeder in a Seattle suburb

These birds forage on the ground. In winter, they often forage in flocks that may contain several different subspecies. They mainly eat seeds and insects, with seeds comprising three quarters of their year-round diet. However, during the breeding season, insects comprise nearly half of the diet of adult dark-eyed juncos. Young dark-eyed juncos also depend on a diet of mainly insects.

A flock of dark-eyed juncos has been known to be called a blizzard.

=== Breeding ===
Dark-eyed juncos usually nest in a cup-shaped depression on the ground, well-hidden by vegetation or other material, although nests are sometimes found in the lower branches of a shrub or tree. The nests have an outer diameter of about 10 cm (3.9 in) and are lined with fine grasses and hair. Normally, two clutches of four eggs are laid during the breeding season. The slightly glossy eggs are grayish or pale bluish-white and heavily spotted (sometimes splotched) with various shades of brown, purple or gray. The spotting is concentrated at the large end of the egg. The eggs are incubated by the female for 12 to 13 days. The young leave the nest between 11 and 14 days after hatching.

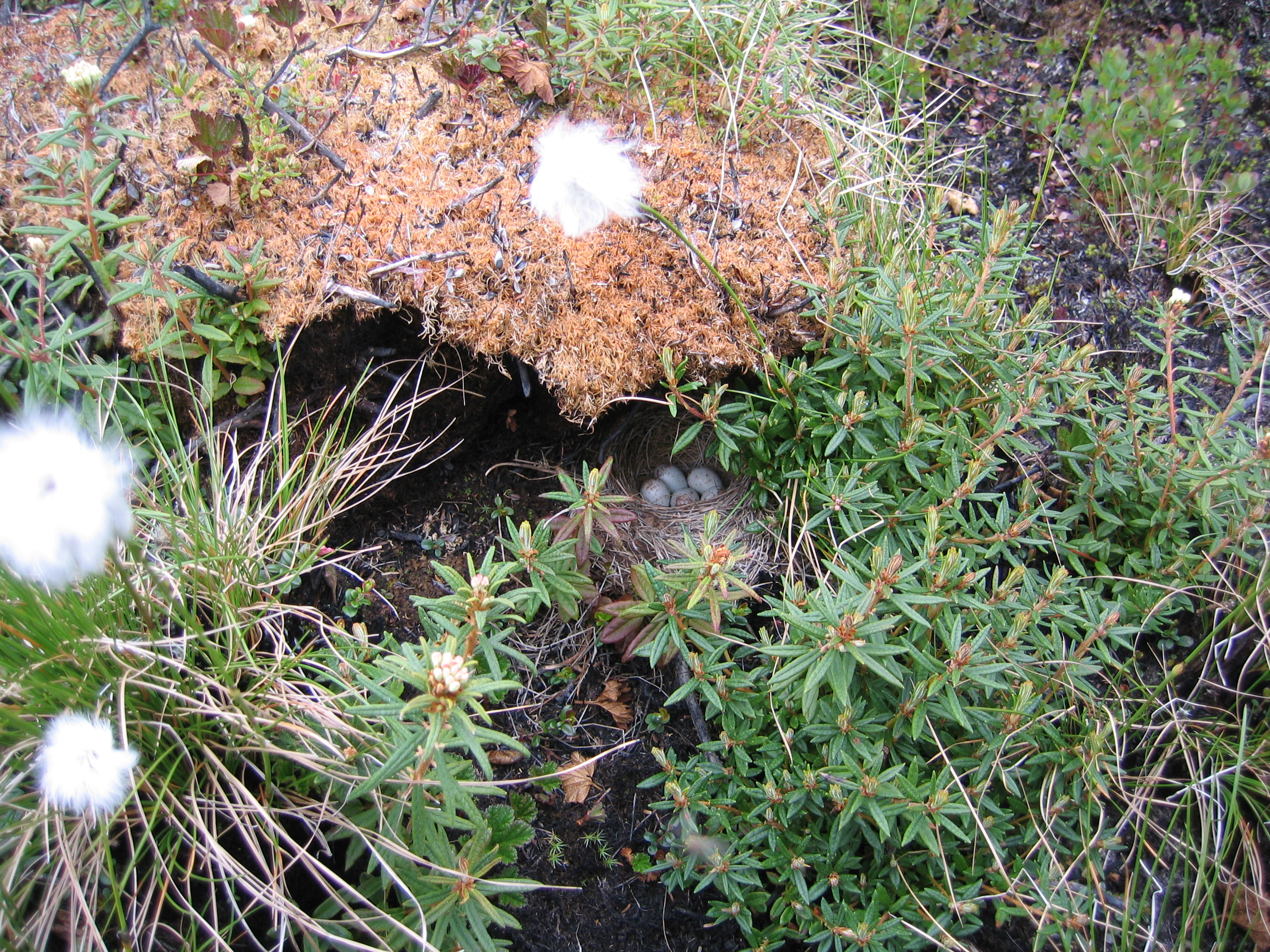
Nest with eggs

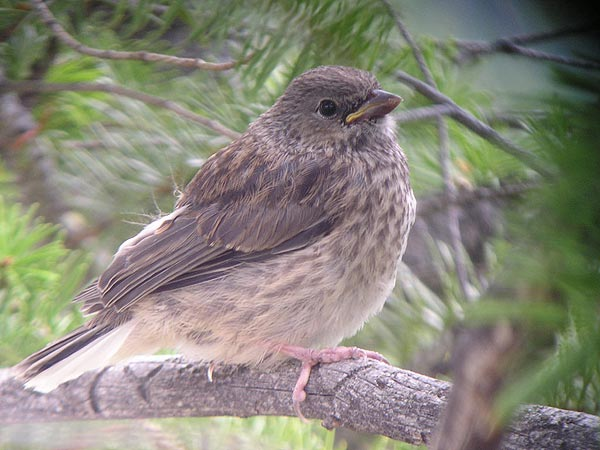
1 month old pink-sided dark-eyed junco (J. h. mearnsi) fledgling, Yellowstone National Park

juvenile J. h. shufeldti, Seattle, WA

== Evolution ==
=== Postglacial theory and diversification ===
Dark-eyed juncos have been widely investigated as a model for rapid speciation. This is due to exceptionally high phenotypic diversity, as seen in the large number of color patterns, over what seems to be a very short amount of time. Current estimates of dark-eyed junco (J. hyemalis) evolution place diversification from yellow-eyed juncos (J. phaeonotus) at 18,000 years ago, based on mtDNA. One theory for the cause of this expansion is postglacial theory. This theory claims ancestral junco populations expanded further north across North America as glaciers melted. Receding glaciers would open up many novel habitats, with new selective pressures. Under those conditions, natural selection can impact populations very strongly, since there are many open niches. Thus, even short periods of isolation can cause populations to diverge. Postglacial theory is supported by yellow-eyed and dark-eyed juncos sharing a dominant haplotype in their mitochondrial DNA, which indicates a recent burst in population. Yellow-eyed juncos are relatively reproductively isolated. Thus, a trait is more likely to be found in both species because of ancestry than gene flow, since the likelihood of interbreeding occurring often enough for the trait to be so common is much less likely than it being inherited from a single ancestral event. The range of red-backed (J. h. dorsalis) and grey-headed juncos (J. h. caniceps) in the south of North America also provides evidence, as the two seem to represent successive steps in developing dark-eyed forms. The red-backed junco is very similar to the yellow-eyed junco in appearance. It also has the most southern range of the dark-eyed junco species. Under postglacial theory, this population would be older than the others, since populations expanded northwards. The gray-headed junco, which is found further north, has the same lighter beak as the rest of the junco complex. Together, they show the number of dark-eyed junco-like traits increasing as they move north. If the postglacial theory applies, northern junco subspecies would have diversified later. This makes their wide range of coloration more notable, since it would have to arise even faster.

Oregon junco group diversification is likely a result of both genetic drift and selection. Geographically isolated subspecies, like J. h. townsendi and J. h. pontilis, had low genetic–environmental association. This meant that most of the differences between them did not grant a measurable benefit to fitness. Instead, most differences were likely due to isolation and small population size. Those would increase the impact of genetic drift, increasing differences between the subspecies. Isolation barriers created by unsuitable desert habitat likely led to this lack of gene flow. Other subspecies, like J. h. pinosis and J. h. thurberi, were much less geographically isolated. Their ranges often overlap, forming zones of intergradation where both subspecies exist and interbreed. Instead of geographic isolation, differences between these subspecies are probably driven by adaptation. This is supported by J. h. pinosis populations correlating with isothermality, or how much temperatures shift from day to night and season to season, and negatively with elevation. This indicates that they likely adapted to those specific conditions. Reproductive barriers could then come from those adaptations and differences in preferred habitat, rather than lack of interaction. There was also notable gene flow between J. h. thurberi, J. h. shufeldti, J. h. montanus and J. h. oreganus. These subspecies formed a latitudinal gradient, where subspecies bleed into each other and decrease or increase in a number in patterns correlating to latitude. Divergence was likely driven by local adaptation along the path north. Overall, it is likely that there is no single mechanism driving the historical diversification of dark-eyed juncos. Different subspecies feel different evolutionary forces with more or less frequency. However, multiple forces compound to drive divergence in all or most of the subspecies. It is likely that in the case of the dark-eyed juncos, these multiple factors have worked to accelerate change. Sexual selection and geographic isolation work to reinforce and amplify small changes established by genetic drift and natural selection. The exact mechanisms behind the speedy diversification of juncos remain a subject for more research.

=== Urbanization ===
Dark-eyed junco populations are also of interest to scientists for how they are responding to urbanization. Much of this is modeled through a population of dark-eyed juncos living on the University of California, San Diego's campus. The population was first studied in the 1980s, and has been a subject of interest for how much they differ from less urban neighboring populations. One of the most notable differences of the UCSD population is that they do not migrate like other populations of Oregon juncos. Instead, they remain on campus year-round. This differentiates them from other junco populations that migrate to the UCSD campus only in the winter. This lack of migration was likely influenced by the San Diego area's mild, Mediterranean climate. This climate also results in longer breeding seasons than exist at higher latitudes. This allows UCSD juncos to have as many as four broods per year, rather than the one or two of nearby populations. Greater brood size, in turn, may have acted as a selective pressure for parental involvement. Since birds breed more within a season, initial mating is less important, and males who are involved in care are more likely to breed again in that same season. UCSD resident birds also flock in pairs more often than overwintering birds, which may have resulted from the same selective pressures.

Despite other junco populations existing nearby, the populations diverge much more than expected. The degree of difference between the UCSD juncos and other local juncos was closer to what would be expected with geographic isolation. Since the nearest populations (located in the mountains) are of the subspecies J. h. thurberi, it was assumed the UCSD birds came from an ancestral J. h. thurberi population. However, genome analysis reveals that the population was likely established from the coastal subspecies J. h. pinosis 20–30 generations ago, which are conditions that make the founder effect very likely to be relevant. This conclusion is further supported by phenotypic similarities: the UCSD birds and J. h. pinosis share similar degrees of white in their tail and nonmigratory behavior. This realization undercuts the idea that urbanization drives the lack of migration, but not that it caused many of the other changes. More evidence comes from the UCSD birds occasionally interbreeding with overwintering J. h. pinosis individuals, but not J. h. thurberi. This is in spite of J. h. thurberi juncos being much more common in the area. If the UCSD population were interbreeding with both, it would most likely have been observed already. Since the founding population was quite small, and the nearest J. h. pinosis population far away, genetic drift likely had a large influence on how the population developed. However, a strong association between habitat variables and functional genes was found. This association is a sign of natural selection and adaptive traits, not drift alone. This indicates that genetic drift is likely not the only evolutionary force at play. Selection is likely magnifying changes initially driven by drift, allowing the UCSD population to diverge from its neighbors very quickly.

More proof of adaptive genes in the UCSD population can be found on the gene level. Two of the most differentiated genes between the ancestral J. h. pinosis population and the UCSD birds were linked to beneficial traits for urban environments. Specifically, an ABCB6 allele conferred better tolerance of heavy metals. As heavy metal poisoning is a documented issue for urban birds, this gene likely increases fitness in urban environments. Variation in KCNQ4 is linked to high-frequency echolocation in bats, and seems to correlate with making higher pitched calls. This is helpful in an urban environment because low-frequency urban noise often drowns out bird calls. With higher pitched vocalizations, calls would be less likely to get lost in that noise. Given the theorized survival advantages, the prevalence of these traits is likely to be driven by natural selection. Research remains to be done on which alleles in the UCSD population serve an adaptive function, and which are likely just consequences of drift. Especially with the discovery that they are more closely related to J. h. pinosis, much pre-existing research may be less relevant. However, they are still a very promising model system for how birds adapt to urban ecosystems.

One such factor may be differences in parasite communities. A study comparing urban and non-urban junco populations across California found that specialist blood parasites like Haemoproteus are nearly absent in urban birds, while generalist parasites such as Plasmodium remain common and increase with rainfall. This shift in parasite pressure could contribute to physiological or behavioral adaptations distinguishing urban juncos from their rural counterparts.

A paper published in December 2025 reported that a study of the dark-eyed junco population at the University of California, Los Angeles (UCLA) reports that the bill sizes and shapes of the birds changed during the anthropause. Prior to the COVID-19 restrictions the bill morphologies of the junco campus population were significantly different from local wild populations, thought at the time to be at least partly due to their diet being mostly the remains of processed foods consumed by campus humans. Birds born during the lockdown had bills that more closely resembled local wildland birds. After the lifting of pandemic restrictions the bills of hatchlings quickly returned to pre-Covid morphology.
