= ABCB6 =

Protein-coding gene in humans

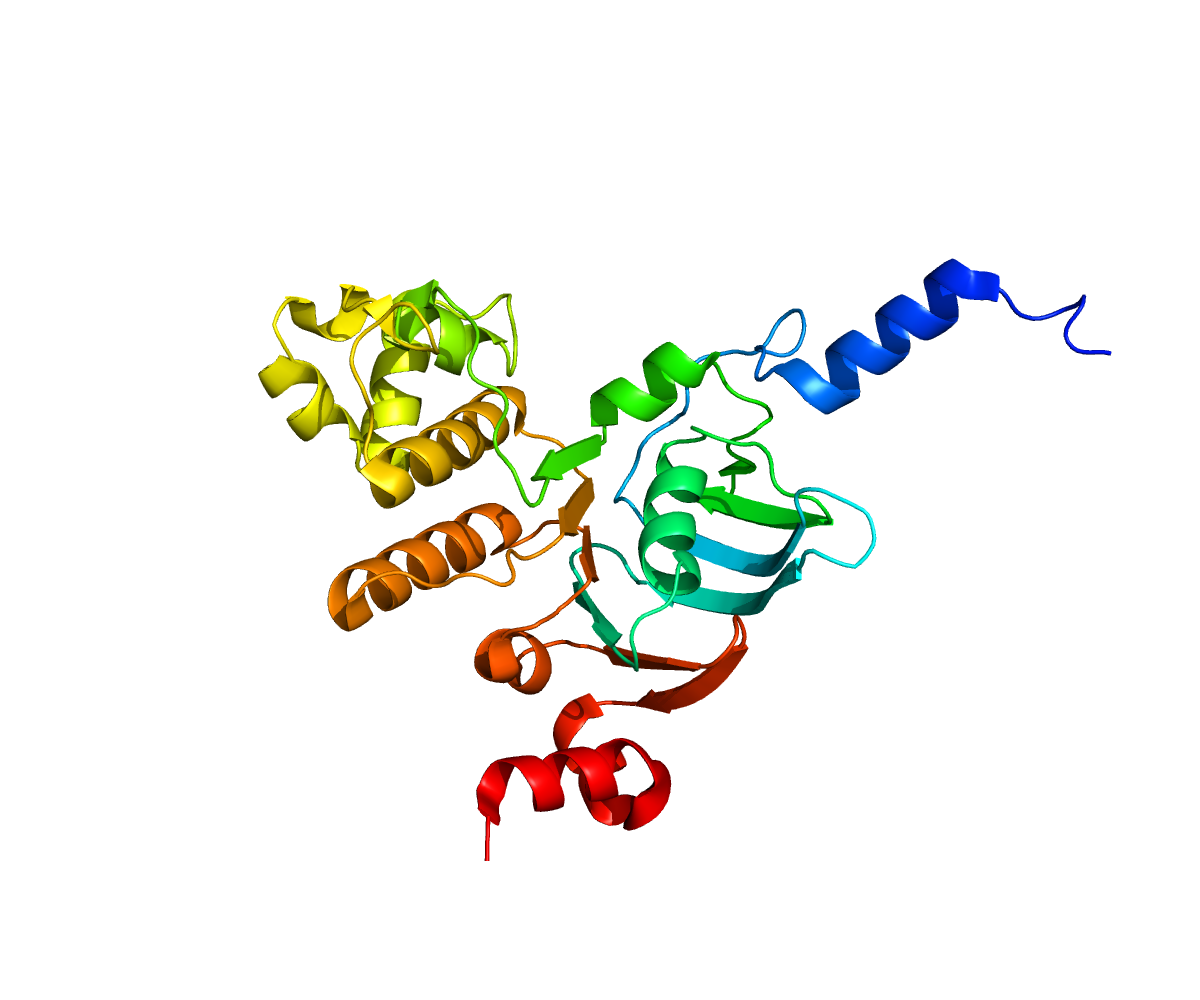

Identifiers
- Aliases: ABCB6, ABC, ABC14, DUH3, LAN, MCOPCB7, MTABC3, PRP, umat, PSHK2, ATP binding cassette subfamily B member 6 (Langereis blood group)
- External IDs: OMIM: 605452; MGI: 1921354; GeneCards: ABCB6
Available structures
PDB	Ortholog search: PDBe RCSB
PDB	List of PDB id codes 3NH6, 3NH9, 3NHA, 3NHB
Enzyme activity
EC #	BRENDA	ExPASy	KEGG	MetaCyc
7.6.2.5	↗	↗	↗	↗

Gene location (Human)
Chr.	Chromosome 2 (human)
Band	2q35	Start	219,209,772 bp
Band	2q35	End	219,218,994 bp

Gene location (Mouse)
Chr.	Chromosome 1 (mouse)
Band	1|1 C4	Start	75,148,361 bp
Band	1|1 C4	End	75,157,036 bp
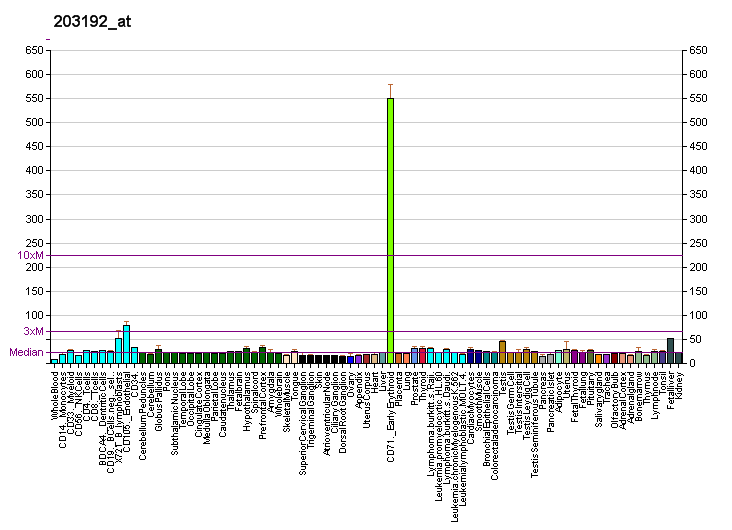
RNA expression pattern
Bgee	Human / Mouse (ortholog); Top expressed in: right ovary; right hemisphere of cerebellum; left ovary; right lobe of thyroid gland; nucleus accumbens; hypothalamus; left testis; right frontal lobe; left lobe of thyroid gland; caudate nucleus / Top expressed in: bone marrow; spermatocyte; proximal tubule; liver; spermatid; white adipose tissue; right kidney; human kidney; muscle of thigh; morula; More reference expression data
BioGPS	More reference expression data
Gene ontology
Molecular function	ATPase-coupled transmembrane transporter activity; nucleotide binding; heme transmembrane transporter activity; ABC-type heme transporter activity; ATPase activity; heme binding; efflux transmembrane transporter activity; ATP binding
Cellular component	integral component of membrane; endosome; Golgi apparatus; endoplasmic reticulum membrane; membrane; ATP-binding cassette (ABC) transporter complex; Golgi membrane; plasma membrane; integral component of mitochondrial outer membrane; mitochondrial outer membrane; endoplasmic reticulum; mitochondrion; mitochondrial envelope; endosome membrane; extracellular exosome; nucleoplasm; cytosol; vacuolar membrane
Biological process	porphyrin-containing compound biosynthetic process; heme transport; brain development; transmembrane transport; skin development; cellular iron ion homeostasis; transport; heme transmembrane transport
Sources:Amigo / QuickGO
Orthologs
Databases	NCBI: entry; OMA: entry
Species	Human	Mouse
Entrez	10058	74104
Ensembl	ENSG00000115657	ENSMUSG00000026198
UniProt	Q9NP58	Q9DC29
RefSeq (mRNA)	NM_005689; NM_001349828	NM_023732
RefSeq (protein)	NP_005680; NP_001336757	NP_076221
Location (UCSC)	Chr 2: 219.21 – 219.22 Mb	Chr 1: 75.15 – 75.16 Mb
PubMed search
- Wikidata
View/Edit Human	View/Edit Mouse

ATP-binding cassette super-family B member 6, mitochondrial is a protein that in humans is encoded by the ABCB6 gene.

The membrane-associated protein encoded by this gene is a member of the superfamily of ATP-binding cassette (ABC) transporters. ABC proteins transport various molecules across extra- and intra-cellular membranes. ABC genes are divided into seven distinct subfamilies (ABC1, MDR/TAP, MRP, ALD, OABP, GCN20, White). This protein is a member of the MDR/TAP subfamily. Members of the MDR/TAP subfamily are involved in multidrug resistance as well as antigen presentation. This half-transporter likely plays a role in mitochondrial function. Localized to 2q26, this gene is considered a candidate gene for Dyschromatosis Universalis Hereditaria, a disorder of skin pigment metabolism. The protein also carries the Lan antigen, which defines the Lan blood group system.

== See also ==
- ATP-binding cassette transporter
