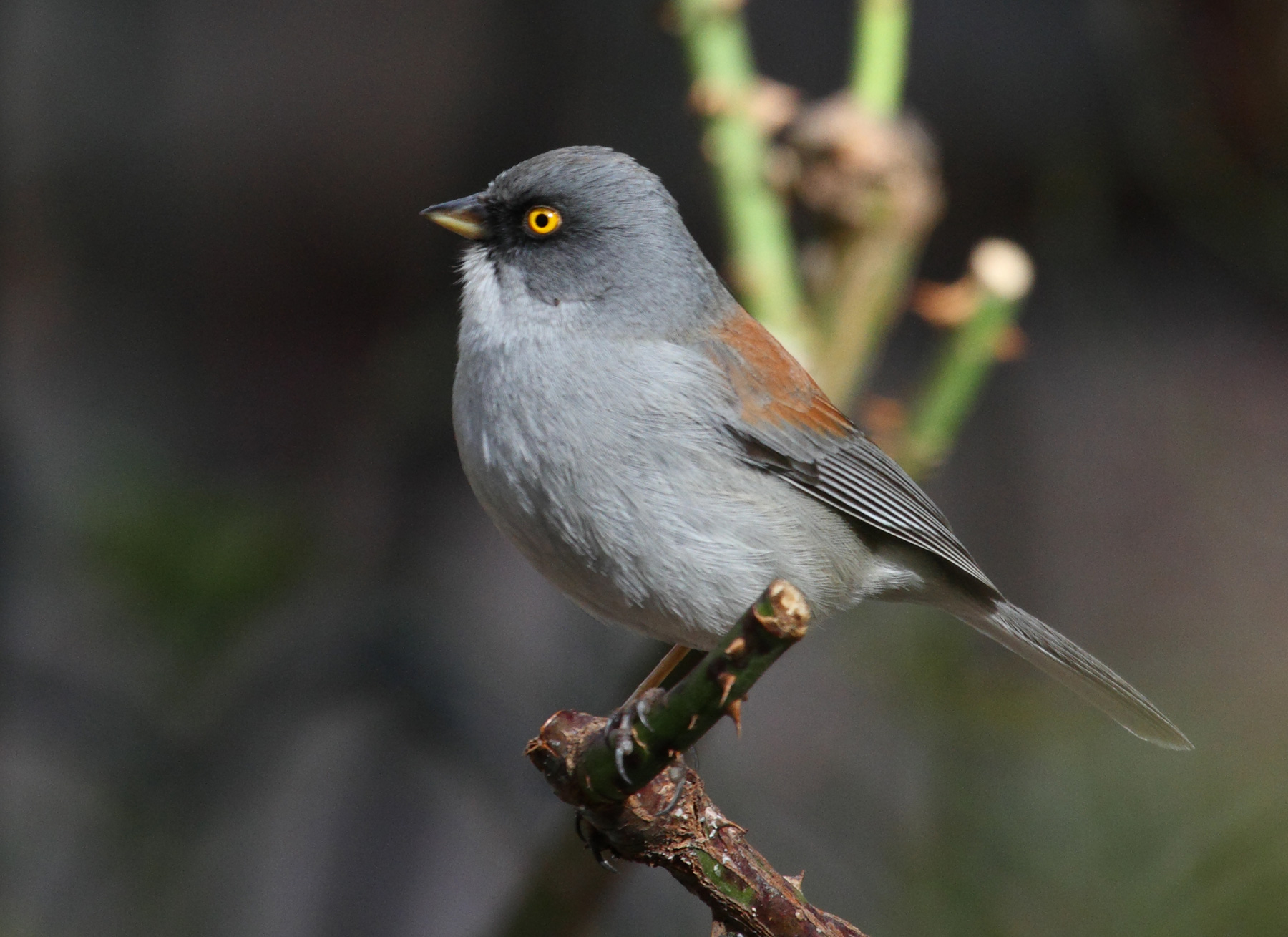
- In Madera Canyon, Arizona

Conservation status
- Least Concern (IUCN 3.1)

Scientific classification
- Kingdom: Animalia
- Phylum: Chordata
- Class: Aves
- Order: Passeriformes
- Family: Passerellidae
- Genus: Junco
- Species: J. phaeonotus

Binomial name
- Junco phaeonotus Wagler, 1831

= Yellow-eyed junco =

Species of bird

The yellow-eyed junco (Junco phaeonotus) is a species of bird in the family Passerellidae, the New World sparrows. It is found from the southwestern United States to Guatemala.

== Taxonomy and systematics ==
The yellow-eyed junco was formally described in 1831 by the German naturalist Johann Georg Wagler from a specimen collected in Mexico. He introduced a new genus, Junco, and coined the binomial Junco phaeonotus. The genus name is from Latin iuncus meaning "rush". The specific epithet combines the Ancient Greek phaios meaning "dusky" or "brown" with -nōtos meaning "-backed".

The yellow-eyed junco has these four subspecies:

- J. p. palliatus Ridgway, 1885
- J. p. phaeonotus Wagler, 1831
- J. p. fulvescens Nelson, 1897
- J. p. alticola Salvin, 1863

Within the species the Clements taxonomy groups J. p. palliatus and J. p. phaeonotus as the "yellow-eyed junco (Mexican)". It calls J. p. fulvescens the "yellow-eyed junco (Chiapas)" and J. p. alticola the "yellow-eyed junco (Guatemalan)". The American Ornithological Society recognizes the same three-way subdivision of the species.

What is now Baird's junco (Junco bairdi) was previously considered a subspecies of the yellow-eyed junco. Following several studies published between 1995 and 2016, taxonomic systems began separating them.

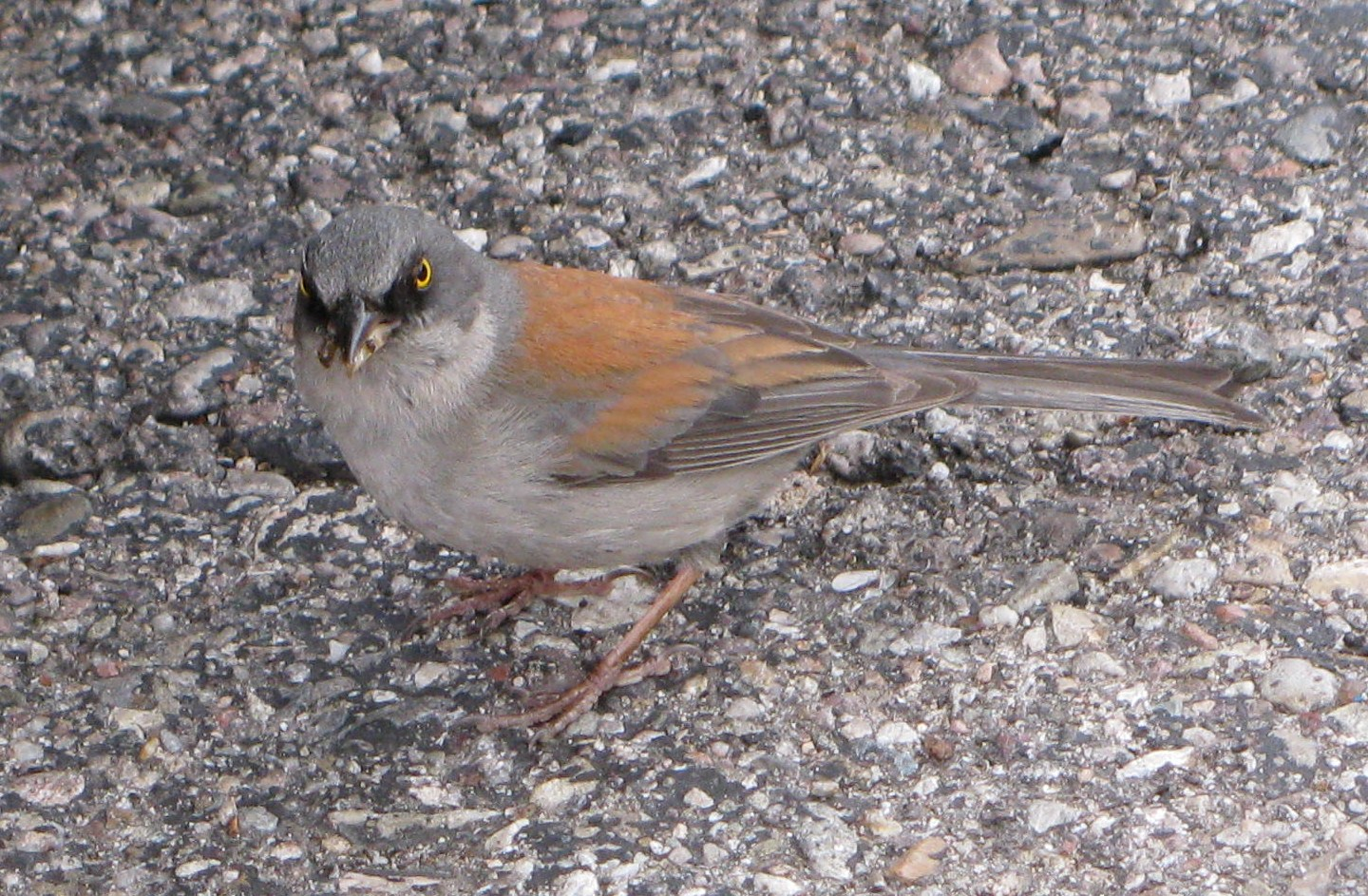
Mount Lemmon, Arizona

== Description ==
The yellow-eyed junco is about 16 cm (6.3 in) long. Subspecies J. p. palliatus weigh 18 to 22 g (0.63 to 0.78 oz). The species is sexually dimorphic but not dramatically so. Adult males of the nominate subspecies J. p. phaeonotus have a mostly medium gray head with black lores, a black "mask" around the eye, and a paler gray chin and throat with an olive tinge. Their upper back is the same medium gray as their head, their lower back and scapulars are rufous, and their rump and uppertail coverts are olive-gray. Their wing's lesser coverts are gray with dusky centers, their medium coverts gray often with a rufous tinge, and their greater coverts are gray with bright rufous bases on their inner webs. The last visually extend the rufous of the scapulars onto the closed wing. Their flight feathers are dusky; the primaries have thin white edges on their outer webs, the secondaries than thin pale gray edges on their outer webs, and the tertials have bright rufous outer webs. Their tail is mostly dark gray-brown; the outermost pair of feathers are mostly white and the next pair inward have dark bases and much white beyond. Their upper breast and sides are the same olive-tinged pale gray as their throat. Their flanks are the same pale gray with a strong olive-buff tinge. Their lower breast, belly, and undertail coverts are grayish white. Adult females have an olive cast to their crown and nape and paler lores than males. Their upperparts including the rufous back are duller and their flanks have a darker olive-buff wash than males. Both sexes have the eponymous bright yellow iris, a blackish maxilla, a pale yellow mandible, and yellowish dusky pink legs and feet.

Males of subspecies J. p. palliatus have an ash-gray head, a deep chestnut upper back, a white belly and flanks, and completely white outermost tail feathers. Males of J. p. fulvescens have a smoke-gray head, a russet-brown upper back, an olive-brown rump, and brown flanks. Their outer tail feathers have an amount of white that is intermediate between those of the nominate and J. p. palliatus. Males of J. p. alticola have a slate-gray head, an olive-brown upper back, an olive rump, light olive flanks, and white on the tail similar to the nominate's.

== Distribution and habitat ==
The yellow-eyed junco has a disjunct distribution. The subspecies are found thus:

- J. p. palliatus: southeastern Arizona and extreme southwestern New Mexico in the U. S. south through western Mexico to Jalisco and Guanajuato and also in Mexico from Coahuila south to Guanajuato
- J. p. phaeonotus: Mexico from Jalisco east to Hidalgo and from there south to Veracruz and Oaxaca
- J. p. fulvescens: interior of southeastern Mexico's Chiapas
- J. p. alticola from southeastern Chiapas into western Guatemala

The yellow-eyed junco is a montane species. It primarily inhabits pine and pine-oak forest and also scrublands and brushy pastures and fields in the upper subtropical and temperate zones. Sources are in general agreement on its elevational range. A twentieth century one states it is 1,200 to 3,400 m (3,900 to 11,200 ft). A 2006 field guide states it is 1,250 to 3,500 m (4,100 to 11,500 ft). A 2020 publication says the species ranges from 1,200 to 3,500 m (3,900 to 11,500 ft) though mostly is found above 2,000 m (6,600 ft). In its limited Guatemalan range it is found between 1,700 to 3,600 m (5,600 to 11,800 ft).

== Behavior ==
=== Movement ===
Though the yellow-eyed junco is mostly a year-round resident, the populations in the U. S. and far northern Mexico make some movements from higher to lower elevations after the breeding season.

=== Feeding ===
During the breeding season the yellow-eyed junco feeds mostly on insects. At other times it adds other arthropods and seeds to its diet. It does much foraging on the ground, usually amid vegetation or otherwise under cover, where it scratches through leaf litter and soil. It also gleans prey from branches, strips seeds from plants, and takes insects in mid-air with a short flight. It also has been observed feeding on sap coming from woodpecker holes. During the breeding season it forages mostly in pairs but forms small flocks during winter.

=== Breeding ===
The yellow-eyed junco breeds between mid-April and late August. Females build the nest by scraping a hollow in the ground and building the nest in it; the site is usually shady. (A minority of nests are built in trees or another elevated site.) The outer structure is coarse grass, pine needles, and moss that is lined with fine grass and hair. Males sometimes bring building materials to the nest site. The clutch in Arizona is usually three or four eggs though one to five are known. The eggs are grayish white or very pale bluish white with reddish or brown markings. The female alone incubates, for 12 to 15 days. Fledging occurs 10 to 13 days after hatch; females brood the nestlings and both parents provision them. Some pairs raise two broods in a season.

=== Vocalization ===
Only male yellow-eyed juncos sing, with some variation by each individual. Their song typically has two or three parts with trills, and has been written as "a musical chip-chip-chip wheedle, wheedle che che che che che". The species has a variety of calls including a "tweeny-tweeny-ting-ting-ting-ting-ting-ting" twitter, a "sharp, metallic" chink, a series of "seep" notes, a "high-pitched chip or cheep", and a high-pitched "see-see-see-see". Males usually sing from a prominent perch such as a tree top.

== Status ==
The IUCN has assessed the yellow-eyed junco as being of Least Concern. It has a very large range; its estimated population of at least 4.3 million mature individuals is believed to be stable. No immediate threats have been identified. It is considered common in the U. S. It is "common to frequent" in Mexico and uncommon in Guatemala.
