= Evolutionary psychology =

Branch of psychology

Evolutionary psychology is a theoretical approach in psychology that examines cognition and behavior from a modern evolutionary perspective. It seeks to identify human psychological adaptations with regard to the ancestral problems they evolved to solve. In this framework, psychological traits and mechanisms are either functional products of natural and sexual selection or non-adaptive by-products of other adaptive traits.

Adaptationist thinking about physiological mechanisms, such as the heart, lungs, and the liver, is common in evolutionary biology. Evolutionary psychologists apply the same line of thinking in psychology, arguing that just as the heart evolved to pump blood, the liver evolved to detoxify poisons, and the kidneys evolved to filter turbid fluids, there is modularity of mind, in that different psychological mechanisms evolved to solve distinct adaptive problems. The evolutionary psychologists argue that much of human behavior is the output of psychological adaptations that evolved to solve recurrent problems in human ancestral environments.

Some evolutionary psychologists argue that evolutionary theory can provide a foundational, metatheoretical framework that integrates the entire field of psychology, much as evolutionary biology has done for biology.

Evolutionary psychologists hold that behaviors or traits that occur universally in all cultures are good candidates for evolutionary adaptations, including the abilities to infer others' emotions, discern kin from non-kin, identify and prefer healthier mates, and cooperate with others. Findings have been made regarding human social behaviour related to infanticide, intelligence, marriage patterns, promiscuity, perception of beauty, bride price, and parental investment.

The theories and findings of evolutionary psychology have applications in many fields, including economics (see sexual economics), environment, health, law, management, psychiatry, politics, and literature.

Criticism of evolutionary psychology involves questions of testability, cognitive and evolutionary assumptions (such as modular functioning of the brain, and large uncertainty about the ancestral environment), importance of non-genetic and non-adaptive explanations, and political and ethical implications of interpretations of research results.

== Scope ==
=== Principles ===
The central assumption of evolutionary psychology is that the human brain is composed of many specialized mechanisms that were shaped by natural selection over a vast period of time to solve the recurrent information-processing problems faced by our ancestors. These problems involve food choices, social hierarchies, the distribution of resources to offspring, and selecting mates. Proponents suggest that it seeks to integrate psychology into the other natural sciences, rooting it in the organizing theory of biology (evolutionary theory), and thus understanding psychology as a branch of biology. Anthropologist John Tooby and psychologist Leda Cosmides wrote:

Evolutionary psychology is the long-forestalled scientific attempt to assemble out of the disjointed, fragmentary, and mutually contradictory human disciplines a single, logically integrated research framework for the psychological, social, and behavioral sciences – a framework that not only incorporates the evolutionary sciences on a full and equal basis, but that systematically works out all of the revisions in existing belief and research practice that such a synthesis requires.

Just as human physiology and evolutionary physiology have worked to identify physical adaptations of the body that represent "human physiological nature," the purpose of evolutionary psychology is to identify evolved emotional and cognitive adaptations that represent "human psychological nature." According to Steven Pinker, it is "not a single theory but a large set of hypotheses" and a term that "has also come to refer to a particular way of applying evolutionary theory to the mind, with an emphasis on adaptation, gene-level selection, and modularity." Evolutionary psychology adopts an understanding of the mind grounded in the computational theory of mind. It describes mental processes as computational operations, so that, for example, a fear response is described as arising from a neurological computation that takes perceptual data, e.g., a visual image of a spider, and outputs the appropriate reaction, e.g., fear of possibly dangerous animals. Under this view, any domain-general learning is impossible because of the combinatorial explosion. Evolutionary psychology specifies the domain as the problems of survival and reproduction.

While philosophers have generally considered the human mind to include broad faculties, such as reason and lust, evolutionary psychologists describe evolved psychological mechanisms as narrowly focused on specific issues, such as catching cheaters or choosing mates. The discipline sees the human brain as having evolved specialized functions, called cognitive modules, or psychological adaptations which are shaped by natural selection.

Examples include language-acquisition modules, incest-avoidance mechanisms, cheater-detection mechanisms, intelligence and sex-specific mating preferences, foraging mechanisms, alliance-tracking mechanisms, agent-detection mechanisms, and others. Some mechanisms, termed domain-specific, deal with recurrent adaptive problems over the course of human evolutionary history. Domain-general mechanisms, on the other hand, are proposed to deal with evolutionary novelty.

Evolutionary psychology has roots in cognitive psychology and evolutionary biology but also draws on behavioral ecology, artificial intelligence, genetics, ethology, anthropology, archaeology, biology, ecopsychology and zoology. It is closely linked to sociobiology, but there are key differences between them including the emphasis on domain-specific rather than domain-general mechanisms, the relevance of measures of current fitness, the importance of mismatch theory, and psychology rather than behavior.

Nikolaas Tinbergen's four categories of questions can help clarify the distinctions among several complementary types of explanations. Evolutionary psychology focuses primarily on the "why?" questions, while traditional psychology focuses on the "how?" questions.

Table of categories
		Diachronic versus synchronic perspective	
		Dynamic view Explanation of current form in terms of a historical sequence	Static view Explanation of the current form of species
How vs. why questions	Proximate view How an individual organism's structures function	Ontogeny (development); Developmental explanations for changes in individuals, from DNA to their current form	Mechanism (causation); Mechanistic explanations for how an organism's structures work
How vs. why questions	Ultimate (evolutionary) view Why a species evolved the structures (adaptations) it has	Phylogeny (evolution); The history of the evolution of sequential changes in a species over many generations	Function (adaptation); A species trait that solves a reproductive or survival problem in the current environment

=== Premises ===
Evolutionary psychology is founded on several core premises.

1. The brain is an information-processing device, and it produces behavior in response to external and internal inputs.
2. The brain's adaptive mechanisms were shaped by natural and sexual selection.
3. Different neural mechanisms are specialized for solving problems in humanity's evolutionary past.
4. The brain has evolved specialized neural mechanisms that were designed for solving problems that recurred over deep evolutionary time, giving modern humans stone-age minds.
5. Most contents and processes of the brain are unconscious, and most mental problems that seem easy to solve are actually extremely difficult problems that are solved unconsciously by complicated neural mechanisms.
6. Human psychology comprises many specialized mechanisms, each sensitive to different classes of information or inputs. These mechanisms combine to produce manifest behavior.

== History ==
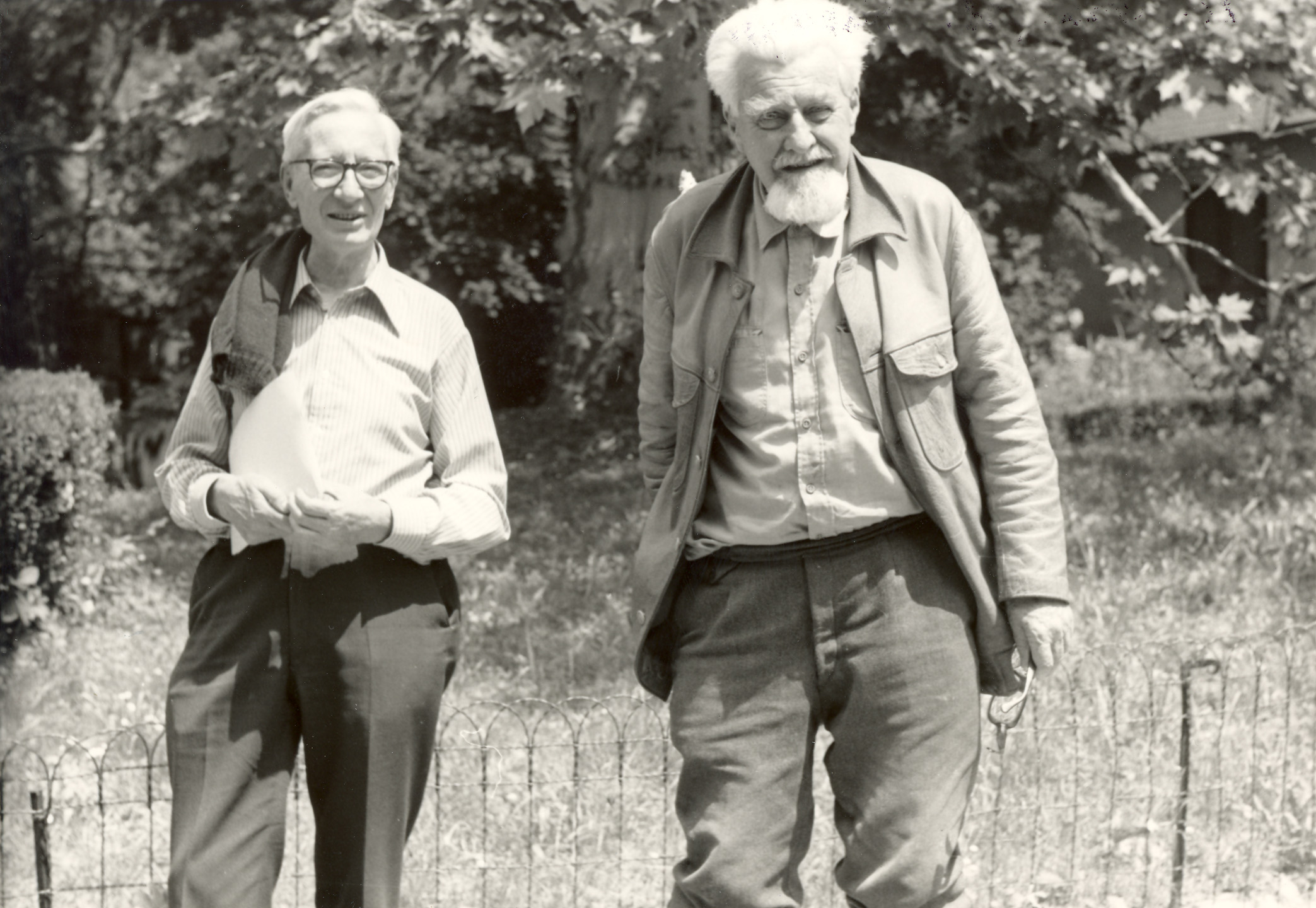
Nobel Laureates Nikolaas Tinbergen (left) and Konrad Lorenz (right) who were, with Karl von Frisch, acknowledged for work on animal behavior

Evolutionary psychology has its historical roots in Charles Darwin's theory of natural selection. In his book On the Origin of Species, Darwin predicted that psychology would develop an evolutionary basis:

In the distant future I see open fields for far more important research. Psychology will be based on a new foundation, that of the necessary acquirement of each mental power and capacity by gradation.

— Charles Darwin

Upon completing On the Origin of Species in 1859, Darwin shifted his focus to creating an evolution-based psychology, having viewed the development of an evolutionary explanation for higher human faculties as his most crucial undertaking since conceiving his theory of evolution in the late 1830s. He devoted more than a decade to study of the evolutionary origins of key aspects of human behaviour, in particular: the human intellect; rationality; human sexual behaviour; emotional expressions; moral behaviour; language; culture; and conscience—several of which Darwin argued had originated due to the unusual ways natural selection operates in social animals, that is, by different kinds of group selection, including kin selection and reciprocal altruism.

Initially conceived as groundwork for one book, Darwin's psychological project became so large and fruitful that he split it into two parts, the first being published as The Descent of Man, and Selection in Relation to Sex in 1871 and the second as The Expression of the Emotions in Man and Animals in 1872. Darwin also published pathbreaking evolutionary monographs on insect and invertebrate behaviour, and—believing that infant behaviour gives us privileged access to humans' evolutionary endowment—a seminal case-study of his baby son William's behaviour, containing many observations confirmed by recent research, including those on: infant-adult communication and meta-communication; infant emotional expressions; early reasoning; the experimental study of infant jealousy; and the origins of self-knowledge.

Darwin's evolutionary psychological publications inspired many of the founders of modern psychology, including: Sigmund Freud and his theories of psychoanalysis, particularly as relating to the Oedipus complex and group psychology; both the physiological and folk psychologies of Wilhelm Wundt; William James's functionalist approach to psychology; the genetic psychology of James Mark Baldwin and thus, indirectly, Jean Piaget; the social behaviourism or symbolic interactionism of George Herbert Mead which set out from Mead's appropriation of Darwin's treatment of gesture and attitude in his book on Expression; and the study of evolved 'instinctive' behaviour in animals—a major topic in On the Origin of Species—known today as ethology and pioneered by Konrad Lorenz, Karl von Frisch and Niko Tinbergen. More recently, Darwin's research on his baby son inspired Colwyn Trevarthen's observational approach to infancy and his theory of innate intersubjectivity. Overall, Darwin's theories of evolution, adaptation, and natural selection have provided and continue to provide many insights into why minds and brains function the way they do.

20th century evolutionary psychologies mostly bypass Darwin's extensive evolutionary treatment of human psychology, drawing instead from: the biological sciences of their day—especially 20th century evolutionary theory as it is imagined to relate to ancient human environments; the study of paleoanthropology; ethology; and various human sciences, most obviously cognitive psychology. For example, writing from a gene-centred perspective on evolution, W.D. Hamilton's (1964) papers on inclusive fitness and Robert Trivers's (1972) theories on reciprocity and parental investment helped to re-establish evolutionary thinking in psychology and the other social sciences, though without reference to the place of parental investment, reciprocal altruism and kin selection in Darwin's psychology. Likewise, in 1975, Edward O. Wilson combined evolutionary theory with studies of animal and social behavior, principally referencing the works of Lorenz and Tinbergen, in his book Sociobiology: The New Synthesis.

In the 1970s, two major branches of ethology developed. Firstly, the study of animal social behavior (including humans) generated sociobiology, defined by its pre-eminent proponent Edward O. Wilson in 1975 as "the systematic study of the biological basis of all social behavior." and in 1978 as "the extension of population biology and evolutionary theory to social organization." Secondly, there was behavioral ecology, which placed less emphasis on social behavior; it focused on the ecological and evolutionary basis of animal and human behavior.

In the 1970s and 1980s, university departments began to include the term evolutionary biology in their titles. The modern era of evolutionary psychology was ushered in, in particular, by Donald Symons' 1979 book The Evolution of Human Sexuality and Leda Cosmides and John Tooby's 1992 book The Adapted Mind. David Buller observed that the term "evolutionary psychology" is sometimes seen as denoting research based on the specific methodological and theoretical commitments of certain researchers from the Santa Barbara school (University of California), thus some evolutionary psychologists prefer to term their work "human ecology", "human behavioural ecology" or "evolutionary anthropology" instead.

In psychology, there are the primary streams of developmental, social, and cognitive psychology. Establishing some measure of the relative influence of genetics and environment on behavior has been at the core of behavioral genetics and its variants, notably studies at the molecular level that examine the relationship between genes, neurotransmitters, and behavior. Dual inheritance theory (DIT), developed in the late 1970s and early 1980s, has a slightly different perspective by trying to explain how human behavior is a product of two different and interacting evolutionary processes: genetic evolution and cultural evolution. DIT is seen by some as a "middle-ground" between views that emphasize human universals versus those that emphasize cultural variation.

== Theoretical foundations ==
The theories on which evolutionary psychology is based originated with Charles Darwin's work, including his speculations about the evolutionary origins of social instincts in humans. Modern evolutionary psychology, however, is possible only because of advances in evolutionary theory in the 20th century. Evolutionary psychologists say that natural selection has provided humans with many psychological adaptations, much the same way it has generated humans' anatomical and physiological adaptations. As with adaptations in general, psychological adaptations are said to be specialized for the environment in which an organism evolved, the environment of evolutionary adaptedness. Sexual selection provides organisms with adaptations related to mating. For male mammals, which have a relatively high maximal potential reproduction rate, sexual selection leads to adaptations that help them compete for females. For female mammals, with a relatively low maximal potential reproduction rate, sexual selection leads to choosiness, which helps females select higher-quality mates. Charles Darwin described both natural selection and sexual selection, and he relied on group selection to explain the evolution of altruistic (self-sacrificing) behavior. But group selection was argued to be a weak explanation by those who adopted the 20th century's individualistic gene-centred view of evolution, because it was thought that in any loosely-bonded group which lacked strong in-group dynamics (of the kind assumed by Darwin), less altruistic individuals will be more likely to survive, and the group will become less self-sacrificing as a whole.

In 1964, the evolutionary biologist William D. Hamilton proposed inclusive fitness theory, emphasizing a gene-centered view of evolution. Hamilton noted that genes can increase the replication of copies of themselves into the next generation by influencing the organism's social traits in such a way that (statistically) results in helping the survival and reproduction of other copies of the same genes (most simply, identical copies in the organism's close relatives). According to Hamilton's rule, self-sacrificing behaviors (and the genes influencing them) can evolve if they typically help the organism's close relatives so much that it more than compensates for the individual animal's sacrifice. Inclusive fitness theory resolved the issue of how altruism can evolve. Other theories also help explain the evolution of altruistic behavior, including evolutionary game theory, tit-for-tat reciprocity, and generalized reciprocity. These theories help to explain the development of altruistic behavior, and account for hostility toward cheaters (individuals that take advantage of others' altruism).

Several mid-level evolutionary theories inform evolutionary psychology. The r/K selection theory proposes that some species prosper by having many offspring, while others follow the strategy of having fewer offspring but investing much more in each one. Humans follow the second strategy. Parental investment theory explains how parents invest more or less in individual offspring based on how successful those offspring are likely to be, and thus how much they might improve the parents' inclusive fitness. According to the Trivers–Willard hypothesis, parents in good conditions tend to invest more in sons (who are best able to take advantage of good conditions), while parents in poor conditions tend to invest more in daughters (who are best able to have successful offspring even in poor conditions). According to life history theory, animals evolve life histories to match their environments, determining details such as age at first reproduction and number of offspring. Dual inheritance theory posits that genes and human culture have interacted, with genes affecting the development of culture and culture, in turn, affecting human evolution on a genetic level, in a similar way to the Baldwin effect.

== Evolved psychological mechanisms ==
Evolutionary psychology posits that psychological traits, like biological organs, have a genetic foundation and have developed through natural selection. Therefore, cognition, having a genetic foundation, is functionally structured and has evolved through natural selection. Similar to other organs and tissues, this functional structure ought to be common to all individuals of a species, tackling essential challenges for survival and reproduction. Evolutionary psychologists seek to understand psychological mechanisms by understanding the survival and reproductive functions they might have served over the course of evolutionary history. These might include abilities to infer others' emotions, discern kin from non-kin, identify and prefer healthier mates, cooperate with others, and follow leaders. Consistent with the theory of natural selection, evolutionary psychology sees humans as often in conflict with others, including mates and relatives. For instance, a mother may wish to wean her offspring from breastfeeding earlier than her infant does, freeing her to invest in additional offspring. Evolutionary psychology also recognizes the roles of kin selection and reciprocity in the evolution of prosocial traits such as altruism. Like chimpanzees and bonobos, humans have subtle and flexible social instincts, allowing them to form extended families, lifelong friendships, and political alliances. In studies testing theoretical predictions, evolutionary psychologists have made modest findings on topics such as infanticide, intelligence, marriage patterns, promiscuity, perception of beauty, bride price, and parental investment. (Note: Quote from Encyclopædia Britannica's article -animal social behavior Despite this difficulty, there have been many careful and informative studies of human social behavior from an evolutionary perspective. Infanticide, intelligence, marriage patterns, promiscuity, perception of beauty, bride price, altruism, and the allocation of parental care have all been explored by testing predictions derived from the idea that conscious and unconscious behaviours have evolved to maximize inclusive fitness. The findings have been impressive.")

=== Historical topics ===
Proponents of evolutionary psychology in the 1990s explored historical events, but the response from historical experts was highly negative, and there has been little effort to continue that line of research. Historian Lynn Hunt says that the historians complained that the researchers:

have read the wrong studies, misinterpreted the results of experiments, or worse yet, turned to neuroscience looking for a universalizing, anti-representational, and anti-intentional ontology to bolster their claims.

Hunt states that "the few attempts to build up a subfield of psychohistory collapsed under the weight of its presuppositions." She concludes that, as of 2014, the "'iron curtain' between historians and psychology...remains standing."

=== Products of evolution: adaptations, exaptations, byproducts, and random variation ===
Not all traits of organisms are evolutionary adaptations. As noted in the table below, traits may also be exaptations, byproducts of adaptations (sometimes called "spandrels"), or random variation between individuals.

Psychological adaptations are hypothesized to be innate or relatively easy to learn and to manifest in cultures worldwide. For example, the toddler's ability to learn a language with virtually no training is likely to be a psychological adaptation. On the other hand, ancestral humans did not read or write; thus, today, learning to read and write requires extensive training, and presumably involves the repurposing of cognitive capacities that evolved under selection pressures unrelated to written language. However, variations in manifest behavior can result from universal mechanisms interacting with different local environments. For example, light-skinned Europeans who move from a northern climate to the equator will develop darker skin. The mechanisms regulating their pigmentation do not change; rather, the input to those mechanisms changes, resulting in different outputs.

	Adaptation	Exaptation	Byproduct	Random variation
Definition	Organismic trait designed to solve an ancestral problem(s). Shows complexity, special "design", functionality	Adaptation that has been "re-purposed" to solve a different adaptive problem.	Byproduct of an adaptive mechanism with no current or ancestral function	Random variations in an adaptation or byproduct
Physiological example	Bones / Umbilical cord	Small bones of the inner ear	White color of bones / Belly button	Bumps on the skull, convex or concave belly button shape
Psychological example	Toddlers' ability to learn to talk with minimal instruction	Voluntary attention	Ability to learn to read and write	Variations in verbal intelligence

One of the tasks of evolutionary psychology is to identify which psychological traits are likely to be adaptations, byproducts, or random variation. George C. Williams suggested that an"adaptation is a special and onerous concept that should only be used where it is really necessary." As noted by Williams and others, adaptations can be identified by their improbable complexity, species universality, and adaptive functionality.

=== Obligate and facultative adaptations ===
A question that may be asked about an adaptation is whether it is generally obligate (relatively robust in the face of typical environmental variation) or facultative (sensitive to typical environmental variation). The sweet taste of sugar and the pain of hitting one's knee against concrete are the result of fairly obligate psychological adaptations; typical environmental variability during development does not much affect their operation. By contrast, facultative adaptations are somewhat like "if-then" statements. For example, adult attachment style seems particularly sensitive to early childhood experiences. As adults, our propensity to develop close, trusting bonds with others is dependent on whether early childhood caregivers can be trusted to provide reliable assistance and attention. The adaptation for skin to tan is conditional on exposure to sunlight; this is an example of another facultative adaptation. When a psychological adaptation is facultative, evolutionary psychologists concern themselves with how developmental and environmental inputs influence its expression.

=== Cultural universals ===
Evolutionary psychologists hold that behaviors or traits that occur universally in all cultures are good candidates for evolutionary adaptations. Cultural universals include behaviors related to language, cognition, social roles, gender roles, and technology. Evolved psychological adaptations (such as the ability to learn a language) interact with cultural inputs to produce specific behaviors (e.g., the specific language learned).

Basic gender differences, such as greater eagerness for sex among men and greater coyness among women, are explained as sexually dimorphic psychological adaptations that reflect the different reproductive strategies of males and females. It has been found that both male and female personality traits vary across a wide spectrum. Males had a higher rate of traits relating to dominance, tension, and directness. Females had higher rates of organizational behavior and more emotionally-oriented characteristics.

Evolutionary psychologists contrast their approach to what they term the "standard social science model," according to which the mind is a general-purpose cognition device shaped almost entirely by culture.

== Environment of evolutionary adaptedness ==
Evolutionary psychology argues that to properly understand the functions of the brain, one must understand the properties of the environment in which the brain evolved. That environment is often referred to as the "environment of evolutionary adaptiveness."

The idea of an environment of evolutionary adaptedness was first explored as a part of attachment theory by John Bowlby. This is the environment to which a particular evolved mechanism is adapted. More specifically, the environment of evolutionary adaptedness is defined as the set of historically recurring selection pressures that formed a given adaptation, as well as those aspects of the environment that were necessary for the proper development and functioning of the adaptation.

Humans, the genus Homo, appeared between 1.5 and 2.5 million years ago, a time that roughly coincides with the start of the Pleistocene 2.6 million years ago. Because the Pleistocene ended a mere 12,000 years ago, most human adaptations either evolved during the Pleistocene or were maintained by stabilizing selection during the Pleistocene. Evolutionary psychology, therefore, proposes that most of human psychological mechanisms are adapted to reproductive problems frequently encountered in Pleistocene environments. In broad terms, these problems include those of growth, development, differentiation, maintenance, mating, parenting, and social relationships.

The environment of evolutionary adaptation is significantly different from modern society. The ancestors of modern humans lived in smaller groups, had more cohesive cultures, and had more stable and rich contexts for identity and meaning.>

Researchers look to existing hunter-gatherer societies for clues as to how hunter-gatherers lived in the environment of evolutionary adaptation. Unfortunately, the few surviving hunter-gatherer societies differ from each other, and they have been pushed out of the best land and into harsh environments, so it is not clear how closely they reflect ancestral culture. However, across the world, small-band hunter-gatherers offer a similar developmental system for the young. The characteristics of the niche are largely the same as for social mammals, who evolved over 30 million years ago: soothing perinatal experience, several years of on-demand breastfeeding, nearly constant affection or physical proximity, responsiveness to need (mitigating offspring distress), self-directed play, and, for humans, multiple responsive caregivers. Initial studies show the importance of these components in early life for positive child outcomes.

Evolutionary psychologists sometimes look to chimpanzees, bonobos, and other great apes for insights into human ancestral behavior.

=== Mismatches ===
When an organism's traits are suited for its old environment, a change in surroundings can result in a mismatch. Our minds, evolved for Pleistocene environments, may possess traits incongruent with the modern world. For instance, it is noteworthy that more than 20,000 people in the US die from gun violence each year. However, spiders and snakes are responsible for very few fatalities. Even so, individuals acquire a fear of spiders and snakes as easily as they do a pointed gun, and more easily than an unpointed gun, rabbits, or flowers. One possible reason is that spiders and snakes posed a danger to early humans during the Pleistocene, unlike guns, rabbits, and flowers. There is a mismatch between our evolved fear responses and the modern world.

This mismatch also shows up in the phenomenon of the supernormal stimulus, a stimulus that elicits a response more strongly than the stimulus for which the response evolved. The term was coined by Niko Tinbergen to refer to non-human animal behavior, but psychologist Deirdre Barrett said that supernormal stimulation governs human behavior as powerfully as that of other animals. She explained junk food as an exaggerated stimulus for cravings for salt, sugar, and fat, and she says that television exaggerates social cues of laughter, smiling faces, and attention-grabbing action. Magazine centerfolds and double cheeseburgers pull instincts intended for an environment of evolutionary adaptedness where breast development was a sign of health, youth, and fertility in a prospective mate, and fat was a rare and vital nutrient. The psychologist Mark van Vugt recently argued that modern organizational leadership is a mismatch. His argument is that humans are not adapted to work in large, anonymous bureaucratic structures with formal hierarchies. The human mind still responds to personalized, charismatic leadership primarily in informal, egalitarian settings. Hence, the dissatisfaction and alienation that many employees experience. Salaries, bonuses, and other privileges exploit instincts for relative status, which attract men in particular to senior executive positions.

== Research methods ==
Evolutionary theory is heuristic in that it may generate hypotheses that might not be developed from other theoretical approaches. One of the main goals of adaptationist research is to identify which organismic traits are likely to be adaptations, and which are byproducts or random variations. As noted earlier, adaptations are expected to show evidence of complexity, functionality, and species universality, while byproducts or random variation will not. In addition, adaptations are expected to be presented as proximate mechanisms that interact with the environment in either a generally obligate or facultative fashion (see above). Evolutionary psychologists are also interested in identifying these proximate mechanisms (sometimes termed "mental mechanisms" or "psychological adaptations") and what type of information they take as input, how they process that information, and their outputs. Evolutionary developmental psychology, or "evo-devo," focuses on how adaptations may be activated at certain developmental times (e.g., losing baby teeth, adolescence, etc.) or how events during the development of an individual may alter life-history trajectories.

Evolutionary psychologists use several strategies to develop and test hypotheses about whether a psychological trait is likely to be an evolved adaptation. David Buss notes that these methods include:

- Cross-cultural Consistency. Characteristics that have been demonstrated to be cross-cultural human universals, such as smiling, crying, and facial expressions, are presumed to be evolved psychological adaptations. Several evolutionary psychologists have collected massive datasets from cultures around the world to assess cross-cultural universality.

- Function to Form (or "problem to solution"). The fact that males, but not females, risk potential misidentification of genetic offspring (referred to as "paternity uncertainty") led evolutionary psychologists to hypothesize that, compared to females, male jealousy would be more focused on sexual than on emotional infidelity.

- Form to Function (reverse-engineering – or "solution to problem"). Morning sickness and associated food aversions during pregnancy seemed to have the characteristics of an evolved adaptation (complexity and universality). Margie Profet hypothesized that the function was to avoid the ingestion of toxins during early pregnancy that could damage the fetus (but which are otherwise likely to be harmless to healthy non-pregnant women).

- Corresponding Neurological Modules. Evolutionary psychology and cognitive neuropsychology are mutually compatible – evolutionary psychology helps to identify psychological adaptations and their ultimate, evolutionary functions, while neuropsychology helps to identify the proximate manifestations of these adaptations.

- Current Evolutionary Adaptiveness. In addition to evolutionary models that suggest evolution occurs over long timescales, recent research has demonstrated that some evolutionary shifts can be fast and dramatic. Consequently, some evolutionary psychologists have focused on the impact of psychological traits in the current environment. Such research can inform estimates of trait prevalence over time. Such work has been informative in the study of evolutionary psychopathology.

Evolutionary psychologists also use various sources of data for testing, including experiments, archaeological records, data from hunter-gatherer societies, observational studies, neuroscience data, self-reports and surveys, public records, and human products. Recently, additional methods and tools have been introduced based on fictional scenarios, mathematical models, and multi-agent computer simulations.

== Main areas of research ==
Foundational areas of research in evolutionary psychology can be divided into broad categories of adaptive problems that arise from evolutionary theory itself: survival, mating, parenting, family and kinship, interactions with non-kin, and cultural evolution.

=== Survival and individual-level psychological adaptations ===
Problems of survival are clear targets for the evolution of physical and psychological adaptations. Major problems the ancestors of present-day humans faced included food selection and acquisition; territory selection and physical shelter; and avoiding predators and other environmental threats.

==== Consciousness ====
Consciousness meets George Williams' criteria of species universality, complexity, and functionality, and it is a trait that apparently increases fitness.

In his paper "Evolution of consciousness," John Eccles argues that special anatomical and physical adaptations of the mammalian cerebral cortex gave rise to consciousness. In contrast, others have argued that the recursive circuitry underwriting consciousness is much more primitive, having evolved initially in pre-mammalian species because it improves the capacity for interaction with both social and natural environments by providing an energy-saving "neutral" gear in an otherwise energy-expensive motor output machine. Once in place, this recursive circuitry may well have provided a basis for the subsequent development of many of the functions that consciousness facilitates in higher organisms, as outlined by Bernard J. Baars. Richard Dawkins suggested that humans evolved consciousness in order to make themselves the subjects of thought. Daniel Povinelli suggests that large, tree-climbing apes evolved consciousness to account for their own mass when moving safely among tree branches. Consistent with this hypothesis, Gordon Gallup found that chimpanzees and orangutans, but not little monkeys or terrestrial gorillas, demonstrated self-awareness in mirror tests.

The concept of consciousness can refer to voluntary action, awareness, or wakefulness. However, even voluntary behavior involves unconscious mechanisms. Many cognitive processes take place in the cognitive unconscious, unavailable to conscious awareness. Some behaviors are conscious when learned but then become unconscious, seemingly automatic. Learning, especially implicitly learning a skill, can take place seemingly outside of consciousness. For example, plenty of people know how to turn right when they ride a bike, but very few can accurately explain how they actually do so.

Evolutionary psychology views self-deception as an adaptation that can improve one's results in social exchanges.

Sleep may have evolved to conserve energy when activity would be less fruitful or more dangerous, such as at night, and especially during the winter season.

==== Sensation and perception ====
Many experts, such as Jerry Fodor, write that the purpose of perception is knowledge, but evolutionary psychologists hold that its primary purpose is to guide action. For example, they say, depth perception seems to have evolved not to help us know the distances to other objects but rather to help us move around in space. Evolutionary psychologists say that animals from fiddler crabs to humans use eyesight for collision avoidance, suggesting that vision is basically for directing action, not providing knowledge.

Building and maintaining sense organs is metabolically expensive, so these organs evolve only when they improve an organism's fitness. More than half the brain is devoted to processing sensory information, and the brain itself consumes roughly one-fourth of one's metabolic resources, so the senses must provide exceptional benefits to fitness. Perception accurately mirrors the world; animals get useful, accurate information through their senses.

Scientists who study perception and sensation have long understood the human senses as adaptations to their surrounding worlds. Depth perception involves of processing over half a dozen visual cues, each of which is based on a regularity of the physical world. Vision evolved to respond to the narrow range of electromagnetic energy that is plentiful and passes through objects. Sound waves go around corners and interact with obstacles, creating a complex pattern that includes useful information about the sources of and distances to objects. Larger animals naturally make lower-pitched sounds as a consequence of their size. The range over which an animal hears, on the other hand, is determined by adaptation. Homing pigeons, for example, can hear the very low-pitched sound (infrasound) that carries great distances, even though most smaller animals detect higher-pitched sounds. Taste and smell respond to chemicals in the environment that are thought to have been significant for fitness in the environment of evolutionary adaptation. For example, salt and sugar were apparently both valuable to the human or pre-human inhabitants of the environment of evolutionary adaptations, so present-day humans have an intrinsic hunger for salty and sweet tastes. The sense of touch is actually many senses, including pressure, heat, cold, tickle, and pain. Pain, while unpleasant, is adaptive. An important adaptation for senses is range shifting, by which the organism becomes temporarily more or less sensitive to sensation. For example, one's eyes automatically adjust to dim or bright ambient light. Sensory abilities of different organisms often coevolve, as is the case with the hearing of echolocating bats and that of the moths that have evolved to respond to the sounds that the bats make.

Evolutionary psychologists contend that perception demonstrates the principle of modularity, with specialized mechanisms handling particular perception tasks. For example, people with damage to a particular part of the brain have the specific defect of not being able to recognize faces (prosopagnosia). Evolutionary psychology suggests that this indicates a so-called face-reading module.

==== Learning and facultative adaptations ====
In evolutionary psychology, learning is said to be accomplished through evolved capacities, specifically facultative adaptations. Facultative adaptations manifest differently in response to environmental input. Sometimes input comes during development and helps shape it. For example, migrating birds learn to orient themselves by the stars during a critical period in their maturation. Evolutionary psychologists believe that humans also learn language along an evolved program, with critical periods. The input can also come during daily tasks, helping the organism cope with changing environmental conditions. For example, animals evolved Pavlovian conditioning to solve problems involving causal relationships. Animals learn most easily when those tasks resemble problems that they faced in their evolutionary past, such as a rat learning where to find food or water. Learning capacities sometimes demonstrate differences between the sexes. In many animal species, for example, males can solve spatial problems faster and more accurately than females, due to the effects of male hormones during development. The same might be true of humans.

==== Emotion and motivation ====
Motivations direct and energize behavior, while emotions provide the affective component to motivation, positive or negative. In the early 1970s, Paul Ekman and colleagues began a line of research that suggests that many emotions are universal. He found evidence that humans share at least five basic emotions: fear, sadness, happiness, anger, and disgust. Social emotions evidently evolved to motivate social behaviors that were adaptive in the environment of evolutionary adaptation. For example, spite seems to work against the individual, but it can establish an individual's reputation as someone to be feared. Shame and pride can motivate behaviors that help one maintain one's standing in a community, and self-esteem is one's estimate of one's status. Motivation has a neurobiological basis in the brain's reward system. Recently, it has been suggested that reward systems may evolve in such a way that there may be an inherent or unavoidable trade-off in the motivational system for activities of short versus long duration.

==== Cognition ====
Cognition refers to internal representations of the world and internal information processing. From an evolutionary psychology perspective, cognition is not "general purpose". Cognition uses heuristics, or strategies, that generally increase the likelihood of solving problems that the ancestors of present-day humans routinely faced. For example, present-day humans are far more likely to solve a logic problem that involves detecting cheating (a common problem given humans' social nature) than the same problem presented in purely abstract terms. Since the ancestors of present-day humans did not encounter truly random events and lived under simpler life conditions, present-day humans may be cognitively predisposed to misperceive patterns in random sequences. Gambler's fallacy is one example of this. Gamblers may falsely believe that they have hit a lucky streak even when each outcome is actually random and independent of previous trials. Many people assume that a coin flip sequence of nine Heads makes Tails more probable on the tenth try. Humans find it far easier to make diagnoses or predictions using frequency data than when the same information is presented as probabilities or percentages. Perhaps these evaluations are connected to ancient human groups residing in small tribes (typically fewer than 150 individuals), where frequency data was more prevalent and unexpected events were less common.

==== Personality ====
Evolutionary psychology is primarily interested in identifying commonalities between people, or the basic human psychological nature. From an evolutionary perspective, the fact that people have fundamental differences in personality traits initially presents something of a puzzle. (Note: The field of behavioral genetics is concerned with statistically partitioning differences between people into genetic and environmental sources of variance. However, understanding the concept of heritability can be tricky – heritability refers only to differences between people, not to the degree to which individual traits are due to environmental or genetic factors, since traits are always a complex interweaving of both.)

Personality traits are conceptualized by evolutionary psychologists as arising from normal variation around an optimum, due to frequency-dependent selection (behavioral polymorphisms), or as facultative adaptations. Like variability in height, some personality traits may simply reflect inter-individual variability around a general optimum. Or, personality traits may represent different genetically predisposed "behavioral morphs" – alternate behavioral strategies that depend on the frequency of competing behavioral strategies in the population. For example, if most of the population is generally trusting and gullible, the behavioral morph of being a "cheater" (or, in the extreme case, a sociopath) may be advantageous. Finally, like many other psychological adaptations, personality traits may be facultative – sensitive to typical variations in the social environment, especially during early development. For example, later-born children are more likely than firstborns to be rebellious, less conscientious, and more open to new experiences, which may be advantageous to them given their particular niche in family structure.

Shared environmental influences do play a role in personality and are not always of less importance than genetic factors. However, shared environmental influences often decrease to near zero after adolescence but do not completely disappear.

==== Language ====
According to Steven Pinker, who builds on the work by Noam Chomsky, the universal human ability to learn to talk between the ages of 1–4, basically without training, suggests that language acquisition is a distinctly human psychological adaptation. Pinker and Bloom argue that language as a mental faculty shares many likenesses with the complex organs of the body, which suggests that, like these organs, language has evolved as an adaptation, since this is the only known mechanism by which such complex organs can develop.

Pinker follows Chomsky in arguing that the fact that children can learn any human language with no explicit instruction suggests that language, including most of grammar, is basically innate and that it only needs to be activated by interaction. Chomsky himself does not believe language to have evolved as an adaptation, but suggests that it likely evolved as a byproduct of some other adaptation, a so-called spandrel. But Pinker and Bloom argue that the organic nature of language strongly suggests an adaptive origin.

Evolutionary psychologists hold that the FOXP2 gene may well be associated with the evolution of human language. In the 1980s, psycholinguist Myrna Gopnik identified a dominant gene that causes language impairment in the KE family of Britain. This gene turned out to be a mutation of the FOXP2 gene. Humans have a unique allele of this gene, which has otherwise been closely conserved through most of mammalian evolutionary history. This unique allele appears to have first arisen between 100 and 200 thousand years ago, and it is now all but universal in humans. However, the once-popular idea that FOXP2 is a 'grammar gene' or that it triggered the emergence of language in Homo sapiens is now widely discredited.

Currently, several competing theories about the evolutionary origin of language coexist, none of them having achieved a general consensus. (Note: Workman & Reader page 277 There are a number of hypotheses suggesting that language evolved to fulfill a social function such as social grooming (to bind large groups together), the making of social contracts (to enable monogamy and male provisioning) and the use of language to impress potential mates. While each of these hypotheses has its merits, each is still highly speculative and requires more evidence from different areas of research (such as linguistics and anthropology).") Researchers of language acquisition in primates and humans, such as Michael Tomasello and Talmy Givón, argue that the innatist framework has understated the role of imitation in learning and that it is not at all necessary to posit the existence of an innate grammar module to explain human language acquisition. Tomasello argues that studies of how children and primates actually acquire communicative skills suggest that humans learn complex behavior through experience, so that instead of a module specifically dedicated to language acquisition, language is acquired by the same cognitive mechanisms used to acquire all other kinds of socially transmitted behavior.

On the issue of whether language is best seen as having evolved as an adaptation or as a spandrel, evolutionary biologist W. Tecumseh Fitch, following Stephen J. Gould, argues that it is unwarranted to assume that every aspect of language is an adaptation, or that language as a whole is an adaptation. He criticizes some strands of evolutionary psychology for suggesting a pan-adaptationist view of evolution, and dismisses Pinker and Bloom's question of whether "Language has evolved as an adaptation" as being misleading. He argues instead that from a biological viewpoint, the evolutionary origins of language are best conceptualized as being the probable result of a convergence of many separate adaptations into a complex system. A similar argument is made by Terrence Deacon who in The Symbolic Species argues that the different features of language have co-evolved with the evolution of the mind and that the ability to use symbolic communication is integrated in all other cognitive processes.

If the theory that language could have evolved as a single adaptation is accepted, the question becomes which of its many functions has been the basis of adaptation. Several evolutionary hypotheses have been posited: that language evolved for social grooming, to signal mating potential, or to form social contracts. Evolutionary psychologists recognize that these theories are all speculative and that much more evidence is required to understand how language might have been selectively adapted.

=== Mating ===
Given that sexual reproduction is the means by which genes are propagated into future generations, sexual selection plays a large role in human evolution. Human mating, then, is of interest to evolutionary psychologists who aim to investigate evolved mechanisms for attracting and securing mates. Several lines of research have stemmed from this interest, such as studies of mate selection, mate poaching, mate retention, mating preferences, and conflict between the sexes.

In 1972, Robert Trivers published an influential paper on sex differences, which is now referred to as parental investment theory. The size differences of gametes (anisogamy) are the fundamental, defining difference between males (small gametes – sperm) and females (large gametes – ova). Trivers noted that anisogamy typically results in different levels of parental investment between the sexes, with females initially investing more. Trivers proposed that this difference in parental investment leads to the sexual selection of different reproductive strategies between the sexes and to sexual conflict. For example, he suggested that the sex that invests less in offspring will generally compete for access to the higher-investing sex to increase their inclusive fitness. Trivers posited that differential parental investment led to the evolution of sexual dimorphisms in mate choice, intra- and inter- sexual reproductive competition, and courtship displays. In mammals, including humans, females make a much larger parental investment than males (i.e., gestation followed by childbirth and lactation). Parental investment theory is a branch of life history theory.

Buss and Schmitt's 1993 sexual strategies theory proposed that, due to differential parental investment, humans have evolved sexually dimorphic adaptations related to "sexual accessibility, fertility assessment, commitment seeking and avoidance, immediate and enduring resource procurement, paternity certainty, assessment of mate value, and parental investment." Their strategic interference theory suggested that conflict between the sexes occurs when the preferred reproductive strategies of one sex interfere with those of the other sex, resulting in the activation of emotional responses such as anger or jealousy

Women are generally more selective when choosing mates, especially under long-term mating conditions. However, under some circumstances, engaging in multiple sexual relationships can provide benefits to women as well, such as fertility insurance, trading up to better genes, reducing the risk of inbreeding, and insurance protection of her offspring.

Due to male paternity uncertainty, sex differences have been found in the domains of sexual jealousy. Females generally react more adversely to emotional infidelity, and males will react more to sexual infidelity. This pattern is predicted because mating costs differ between the sexes. Women, on average, should prefer a mate who can offer resources (e.g., financial, commitment); thus, a woman risks losing such resources when a mate commits emotional infidelity. Men, on the other hand, are never certain of the genetic paternity of their children because they do not bear the offspring themselves. This suggests that for men, sexual infidelity would generally be more aversive than emotional infidelity because investing resources in another man's offspring does not lead to the propagation of their own genes.

Another interesting line of research examines women's mate preferences across the ovulatory cycle. The theoretical underpinning of this research is that ancestral women would have evolved mechanisms to select mates with certain traits depending on their hormonal status. Known as the ovulatory shift hypothesis, the theory posits that, during the ovulatory phase of a woman's cycle (approximately days 10–15 of a woman's cycle), a woman who mated with a male with high genetic quality would have been more likely, on average, to produce and bear a healthy offspring than a woman who mated with a male with low genetic quality. These putative preferences are expected to be especially apparent in short-term mating domains because a potential male mate would offer only genes to a potential offspring. This hypothesis allows researchers to examine whether women select mates with characteristics indicative of high genetic quality during the high fertility phase of their ovulatory cycles. Indeed, studies have shown that women's preferences vary across the ovulatory cycle. In particular, Haselton and Miller (2006) showed that highly fertile women prefer creative but poor men as short-term mates. Creativity may be a proxy for good genes. Research by Steven Gangestad in 2004 indicates that highly fertile women prefer men who display social presence and intrasexual competition; these traits may act as cues that help women predict which men may have, or be able to acquire, resources.

=== Parenting ===
Reproduction inherently involves a cost for women, and men may also bear this cost. Individuals have limited time and resources to dedicate to their children, and this commitment can harm their own future health, survival, and reproductive potential. Parental investment is any parental expenditure (time, energy, etc.) that benefits one offspring at a cost to parents' ability to invest in other components of fitness. Components of fitness (Beatty 1992Components of fitness (Beatty 1992) include the well-being of existing offspring, parents' future reproduction, and inclusive fitness through aid to kin (Hamilton, 1964). Parental investment theory is a branch of life history theory.

The benefits of parental investment to the offspring are large and are associated with the effects on condition, growth, survival, and ultimately, on the reproductive success of the offspring. However, these benefits can come at the cost of the parent's future reproductive ability, e.g., increased risk of injury when defending offspring against predators, the loss of mating opportunities whilst rearing offspring, and an increase in the time to the next reproduction. Overall, parents are selected to maximize the difference between the benefits and the costs, and parental care will likely evolve when the benefits exceed the costs.

The Cinderella effect is an alleged high incidence of stepchildren being physically, emotionally, or sexually abused, neglected, murdered, or otherwise mistreated at the hands of their stepparents at significantly higher rates than their genetic counterparts. It takes its name from the fairy tale character Cinderella, who in the story was cruelly mistreated by her stepmother and stepsisters. Martin Daly and Margo Wilson noted in their 1999 book:

Evolutionary thinking led to the discovery of the most important risk factor for child homicide – the presence of a stepparent. Parental efforts and investments are valuable resources, and selection favors those parental psyches that allocate effort effectively to promote fitness. The adaptive problems that challenge parental decision-making include accurately identifying one's offspring, allocating resources among them with sensitivity to their needs and abilities, and converting parental investment into fitness increments.... Stepchildren were seldom or never so valuable to one's expected fitness as one's own offspring would be, and those parental psyches that were easily parasitized by just any appealing youngster must always have incurred a selective disadvantage.

— Martin Daly and Margo Wilson, The Truth about Cinderella: A Darwinian View of Parental Love,

However, they note that not all stepparents will "want" to abuse their partner's children, or that genetic parenthood is any insurance against abuse. They see step-parental care as primarily "mating effort" towards the genetic parent.

=== Family and kin ===
Inclusive fitness is the sum of an organism's classical fitness (how many of its own offspring it produces and supports) and the number of equivalents of its own offspring it can add to the population by supporting others. The first component is called classical fitness by Hamilton (1964).

From the gene's point of view, evolutionary success ultimately depends on leaving behind the maximum number of copies of itself in the population. Until 1964, it was generally believed that genes only achieved this by causing the individual to leave the maximum number of viable offspring. However, in 1964, W. D. Hamilton proved mathematically that, because close relatives of an organism share some identical genes, a gene can also increase its evolutionary success by promoting the reproduction and survival of these related or otherwise similar individuals. Hamilton concluded that this leads natural selection to favor organisms that would behave in ways that maximize their inclusive fitness. It is also true that natural selection favors behavior that maximizes personal fitness.

Hamilton's rule describes mathematically whether or not a gene for altruistic behavior will spread in a population:

rb > c

where

- c is the reproductive cost to the altruist,
- b is the reproductive benefit to the recipient of the altruistic behavior, and
- r is the probability, above the population average, of the individuals sharing an altruistic gene – commonly viewed as "degree of relatedness".

The concept explains how natural selection can perpetuate altruism. If there is an "altruism gene" (or complex of genes) that influences an organism's behavior to be helpful and protective of relatives and their offspring, this behavior also increases the proportion of the altruism gene in the population, because relatives are likely to share genes with the altruist due to common descent. Altruists may also recognize altruistic behavior in unrelated individuals and be inclined to support them. As Dawkins points out in The Selfish Gene (Chapter 6) and The Extended Phenotype, this must be distinguished from the green-beard effect.

Although it is generally true that humans tend to be more altruistic toward their kin than toward non-kin, the relevant proximate mechanisms that mediate this cooperation have been debated (see kin recognition), with some arguing that kin status is determined primarily via social and cultural factors (such as co-residence, maternal association of sibs, etc.), while others have argued that kin recognition can also be mediated by biological factors such as facial resemblance and immunogenetic similarity of the major histocompatibility complex (MHC).

The interaction between these social and biological kin-recognition factors was discussed in the 2007 Nature article – The architecture of human kin detection.

Whatever the proximate mechanisms of kin recognition, there is substantial evidence that humans are generally more altruistic towards close genetic kin compared to genetic non-kin.

=== Interactions with non-kin / reciprocity ===
Although interactions with non-kin are generally less altruistic compared to those with kin, cooperation can be maintained with non-kin via mutually beneficial reciprocity as was proposed by Robert Trivers If there are repeated encounters between the same two players in an evolutionary game in which each of them can choose either to "cooperate" or "defect", then a strategy of mutual cooperation may be favored even if it pays each player, in the short term, to defect when the other cooperates. Direct reciprocity can lead to the evolution of cooperation only if the probability, w, of another encounter between the same two individuals exceeds the cost-to-benefit ratio of the altruistic act:

w > c/b

Reciprocity can also be indirect if information about previous interactions is shared. Reputation enables the evolution of cooperation by indirect reciprocity. Natural selection favors strategies that base the decision to help on the recipient's reputation: studies show that people who are more helpful are more likely to receive help. The calculations of indirect reciprocity are complicated, and only a tiny fraction of this universe has been uncovered, but again, a simple rule has emerged. Indirect reciprocity can only promote cooperation if the probability, q, of knowing someone's reputation exceeds the cost-to-benefit ratio of the altruistic act:

q > c/b

One important problem with this explanation is that individuals may be able to evolve the capacity to obscure their reputations, reducing the probability, q, that it will be known.

Trivers argues that friendship and various social emotions evolved in order to manage reciprocity. Liking and disliking, he says, evolved to help present-day humans' ancestors form coalitions with others who reciprocated and to exclude those who did not reciprocate. Moral indignation may have evolved to prevent one's altruism from being exploited by cheaters, and gratitude may have motivated present-day humans' ancestors to reciprocate appropriately after benefiting from others' altruism. Likewise, present-day humans feel guilty when they fail to reciprocate. These social motivations match what evolutionary psychologists expect to see in adaptations that evolved to maximize the benefits and minimize the drawbacks of reciprocity.

According to evolutionary psychologists, humans possess psychological adaptations that developed to help us spot cheaters, also known as non-reciprocators. In 1993, Robert Frank and his associates found that participants in a prisoner's dilemma scenario were often able to predict whether their partners would "cheat", based on a half-hour of unstructured social interaction. In a 1996 experiment, for example, Linda Mealey and her colleagues found that people were better at remembering faces when those faces were associated with stories about those individuals cheating (such as embezzling money from a church).

=== Strong reciprocity (or "tribal reciprocity") ===
Humans may have an evolved set of psychological adaptations that predispose them to be more cooperative than otherwise would be expected with members of their tribal in-group, and nastier to members of tribal out-groups. These adaptations may have been a consequence of tribal warfare.

Humans may also have predispositions for "altruistic punishment" – to punish in-group members who violate in-group rules, even when this altruistic behavior cannot be justified in terms of helping those you are related to (kin selection), cooperating with those who you will interact with again (direct reciprocity), or cooperating to better your reputation with others (indirect reciprocity).

== Evolutionary psychology and culture ==
Though evolutionary psychology has traditionally focused on individual-level behaviors, determined by species-typical psychological adaptations, considerable work has examined how these adaptations shape and, ultimately, govern culture. In 1989, Tooby and Cosmides argued that the mind consists of many domain-specific psychological adaptations, some of which may constrain what cultural material is learned or taught. As opposed to a domain-general cultural acquisition program, where an individual passively receives culturally-transmitted material from the group,

Tooby and Cosmides, among others, argue that:

The psyche evolved to generate adaptive rather than repetitive behavior, and hence critically analyzes the behavior of those surrounding it in highly structured and patterned ways, to be used as a rich (but by no means the only) source of information out of which to construct a 'private culture' or individually tailored adaptive system; in consequence, this system may or may not mirror the behavior of others in any given respect.
Tooby and Cosmides 1989.

Biological explanations of human culture also brought criticism to evolutionary psychology: Evolutionary psychologists see the human psyche and physiology as a genetic product and assume that genes contain the information for the development and control of the organism and that this information is transmitted from one generation to the next via genes. Evolutionary psychologists, therefore, view the physical and psychological characteristics of humans as genetically programmed. Even then, when evolutionary psychologists acknowledge the influence of the environment on human development, they understand the environment only as an activator or trigger for the programmed developmental instructions encoded in genes. Evolutionary psychologists, for example, believe that the human brain is composed of innate modules, each specialised for a specific task, e.g., an anxiety module. According to evolutionary psychologists, these modules are present before the organism actually develops and are then activated by some environmental event. Critics object that this view is reductionist and that cognitive specialisation arises only through the interaction of humans with their real environment, rather than the environment of distant ancestors. Interdisciplinary approaches are increasingly striving to mediate between these opposing points of view and to highlight that biological and cultural causes need not be antithetical to explain human behaviour, including complex cultural achievements.

== In psychology sub-fields ==
=== Developmental psychology ===
According to Paul Baltes, the benefits granted by evolutionary selection decrease with age. Natural selection has not eliminated many harmful conditions and nonadaptive characteristics that appear among older adults, such as Alzheimer's disease. If it were a disease that killed 20-year-olds instead of 70-year-olds, this might have been a disease that natural selection could have eliminated ages ago. Thus, unaided by evolutionary pressures against non-adaptive conditions, modern humans suffer the aches, pains, and infirmities of aging, and as the benefits of evolutionary selection decrease with age, the need for modern technological mediums against non-adaptive conditions increases.

=== Social psychology ===
As humans are a highly social species, there are many adaptive problems associated with navigating the social world (e.g., maintaining allies, managing status hierarchies, interacting with outgroup members, coordinating social activities, collective decision-making). Researchers in the emerging field of evolutionary social psychology have made many discoveries pertaining to topics traditionally studied by social psychologists, including person perception, social cognition, attitudes, altruism, emotions, group dynamics, leadership, motivation, prejudice, intergroup relations, and cross-cultural differences.

When endeavouring to solve a problem, humans, at an early age, show determination, whereas chimpanzees do not exhibit a comparable facial expression. Researchers suspect the human-determined expression evolved because when a human is determinedly working on a problem, other people will frequently help.

=== Abnormal psychology ===
Adaptationist hypotheses regarding the etiology of psychological disorders are often based on analogies between physiological and psychological dysfunctions, as noted in the table below. Prominent theorists and evolutionary psychiatrists include Michael T. McGuire, Anthony Stevens, and Randolph M. Nesse. They, and others, suggest that mental disorders are due to the interactive effects of both nature and nurture, and often have multiple contributing causes.

Possible causes of psychological abnormalities from an adaptationist perspective Summary based on information contained in these textbooks
Causal mechanism of failure or malfunction of adaptation	Physiological Example	Hypothesized Psychological Example
Functioning adaptation (adaptive defense)	Fever / Vomiting (functional responses to infection or ingestion of toxins)	Mild depression or anxiety (functional responses to mild loss or stress/ reduction of social interactions to prevent infection by contagious pathogens)
By-product of an adaptation(s)	Intestinal gas (byproduct of digestion of fiber)	Sexual fetishes (?) (possible byproduct of normal sexual arousal adaptations that have 'imprinted' on unusual objects or situations)
Adaptations with multiple effects	Sickle cell disease (Gene that imparts malaria resistance, in homozygous form, causes sickle cell anemia)	Schizophrenia or bipolar disorder (May be side-effects of adaptations for high levels of creativity, perhaps dependent on alternate developmental trajectories)
Malfunctioning adaptation	Allergies (over-reactive immunological responses)	Autism (possible malfunctioning of theory of mind module)
Frequency-dependent morphs	The two sexes / Different blood and immune system types	Personality disorders (may represent alternative behavioral strategies possibly dependent on its prevalence in the population)
Mismatch between ancestral & current environments	Type 2 Diabetes (May be related to the abundance of sugary foods in the modern world)	More frequent modern interaction with strangers (compared to family and close friends) may predispose greater incidence of depression & anxiety
Tails of normal distribution (bell curve)	Dwarfism or gigantism	Extremities of the distribution of cognitive and personality traits (e.g., extremely introversion and extraversion, or intellectual giftedness and intellectual disability)

Evolutionary psychologists have suggested that schizophrenia and bipolar disorder may reflect a side-effect of genes with fitness benefits, such as increased creativity. (Note: Some individuals with bipolar disorder are especially creative during their manic phase, and the close relatives of people with schizophrenia have been found to be more likely to have creative professions.) A 1994 report by the American Psychiatry Association found that the incidence of schizophrenia occurs at roughly the same rate in Western and non-Western cultures, and in industrialized and pastoral societies, suggesting that schizophrenia is not a disease of civilization nor an arbitrary social invention. Sociopathy may represent an evolutionarily stable strategy, by which a small number of people who cheat on social contracts benefit in a society consisting mostly of non-sociopaths Mild depression may be an adaptive response to withdraw from, and re-evaluate, situations that have led to disadvantageous outcomes (the "analytical rumination hypothesis") (see Evolutionary approaches to depression).

Trofimova reviewed the most consistent psychological and behavioural sex differences in psychological abilities and disabilities and linked them to Geodakyan's Evolutionary Theory of Sex (ETS). She pointed out that a pattern of consistent sex differences in physical, verbal, and social disabilities corresponds to the idea of the ETS, considering sex dimorphism as a functional specialization of a species.

Sex differentiation, according to the ETS, creates two partitions within a species:

- conservational (females)
- variational (males).

In females, superiority in verbal abilities, higher rule obedience, socialisation, empathy, and agreeableness can be seen as reflecting the systemic conservation function of the female sex. Men often excel in areas such as exploration, risk-taking, spatial abilities, physical strength, and aggression. This pattern, along with elevated birth and accidental death rates, could indicate the male sex's systematic variational function, which explores the limits of advantageous traits. This suggests that psychological sex differences are affected by a species' general drive to expand its adaptive flexibility while retaining valuable characteristics.

Moreover, Trofimova suggested a "redundancy pruning" hypothesis as an upgrade of the ETS theory. She pointed out higher rates of psychopathy, dyslexia, autism, and schizophrenia in males, in comparison to females. She suggested that the variational function of the "male partition" might also provide irrelevance/redundancy pruning of excesses in a bank of beneficial characteristics of a species, while continuing resistance to any changes from the norm-driven conservational partition of species. This might explain a contradictory allocation of a high drive for social status/power in the male sex, with their lower (among the two sexes) abilities for social interaction. The high rates of communicative disorders and psychopathy in males might facilitate their higher rates of disengagement from normative expectations and their insensitivity to social disapproval when they deliberately do not follow social norms.

Some of these speculations have yet to be developed into fully testable hypotheses, and much research is required to confirm their validity.

=== Antisocial and criminal behavior ===
Evolutionary psychology has been applied to explain criminal or otherwise immoral behavior as being adaptive or related to adaptive behaviors. Males are generally more aggressive than females, who are more selective of their partners because of the far greater effort they have to contribute to pregnancy and child-rearing. Males' greater aggressiveness is hypothesized to stem from the more intense reproductive competition they faced. Males of low status may be especially vulnerable to being childless. It may have been evolutionarily advantageous to engage in highly risky, violent behavior to increase their status and therefore reproductive success. This may explain why males are generally involved in more crimes, and why low status and being unmarried are associated with criminality. Furthermore, competition over females is argued to have been particularly intensive in late adolescence and young adulthood, which is theorized to explain why crime rates are particularly high during this period. Some sociologists have underlined differential exposure to androgens as the cause of these behaviors, notably Lee Ellis in his evolutionary neuroandrogenic (ENA) theory.

Many conflicts that result in harm and death involve status, reputation, and seemingly trivial insults. Steven Pinker in his book The Better Angels of Our Nature argues that in non-state societies without a police it was very important to have a credible deterrence against aggression. Therefore, it was important to be perceived as having a credible reputation for retaliation, leading humans in developing instincts for revenge as well as for protecting reputation ("honor"). Pinker argues that the development of the state and the police has dramatically reduced the level of violence compared to the ancestral environment. Whenever the state breaks down, which can be very local, such as in poor areas of a city, humans again organize in groups for protection and aggression, and concepts such as violent revenge and protecting honor again become extremely important.

Rape is theorized to be a reproductive strategy that facilitates the propagation of the rapist's progeny. Such a strategy may be adopted by men who otherwise are unlikely to be appealing to women and therefore cannot form legitimate relationships, or by high-status men on socially vulnerable women who are unlikely to retaliate to increase their reproductive success even further. The sociobiological theories of rape are highly controversial, as traditional theories typically do not consider rape to be a behavioral adaptation, and objections to this theory are made on ethical, religious, political, as well as scientific grounds.

=== Psychology of religion ===
Adaptationist perspectives on religious belief suggest that, like all behavior, religious beliefs are a product of the human brain. As with all other organ functions, cognition's functional structure has been argued to have a genetic foundation and is therefore subject to the effects of natural selection and sexual selection. Like other organs and tissues, this functional structure should be universally shared amongst humans and should have solved important problems of survival and reproduction in ancestral environments. However, evolutionary psychologists remain divided on whether religious belief is more likely a consequence of evolved psychological adaptations or a byproduct of other cognitive adaptations.

=== Coalitional psychology ===
Coalitional psychology is an approach to explaining political behaviors among different coalitions and the conditionality of these behaviors in an evolutionary psychological perspective. This approach assumes that since human beings appeared on the earth, they have evolved to live in groups instead of living as individuals to achieve benefits such as more mating opportunities and increased status. Human beings thus naturally think and act in a way that manages and negotiates group dynamics.

Coalitional psychology offers falsifiable ex ante prediction by positing five hypotheses on how these psychological adaptations operate:

- Humans represent groups as a special category of individual, unstable, and with a short shadow of the future
- Political entrepreneurs strategically manipulate the coalitional environment to inspire collective action, often appealing to emotion.
- Relative gains dominate relations with enemies, whereas absolute gains characterize relations with allies.
- Coalitional size and male physical strength will positively predict individual support for aggressive foreign policies.
- Individuals with children, particularly women, will vary in adopting aggressive foreign policies than those without progeny.

== Reception and criticism ==
Critics of evolutionary psychology accuse it of promoting genetic determinism, pan-adaptationism (the idea that all behaviors and anatomical features are adaptations), unfalsifiable hypotheses, distal or ultimate explanations of behavior when proximate explanations are superior, and malevolent political or moral ideas.

=== Ethical implications ===
Critics have argued that evolutionary psychology might be used to justify existing social hierarchies and reactionary policies. Evolutionary psychology has also been used historically to justify malicious ideologies. Anthropometry in the late 19th century directly related genetics and biological measurements to criminal psychology. White nationalism in the 21st century relies on genetic ancestry testing to erroneously demonstrate racial purity and superiority. It has also been suggested by critics that evolutionary psychologists' theories and interpretations of empirical data rely heavily on ideological assumptions about race and gender. The field's reliance on empirical data has also raised concerns towards what society and statistics views as normal or abnormal, cautioning scientists to consider the eugenic roots of empirical data.

In response to such criticism, evolutionary psychologists often caution against committing the naturalistic fallacy – the assumption that "what is natural" is necessarily a moral good. However, their caution against committing the naturalistic fallacy has been criticized as a means to stifle legitimate ethical discussions. Other responses to these potential ethical implications counter that evolutionary psychology should be seen in a different perspective - one where evolutionary psychology connects only the intrinsic human nervous system and the resulting primitive, universal behaviors to evolutionary processes.

=== Contradictions in models ===
Some criticisms of evolutionary psychology point to contradictions between different aspects of adaptive scenarios posited by evolutionary psychology. One example is evolutionary psychology's claim that extended social groups select for modern human brains. However, the synaptic function of modern human brains requires high amounts of many specific essential nutrients. Sharing this requirement among all individuals in a population would decrease the possibility of forming large groups, due to bottleneck foods with rare essential nutrients capping group sizes. Furthermore, it is noted that some insects have societies with distinct ranks for individuals, despite having smaller connectomes relative to humans. Also, monkeys remain socially functioning after the removal of most of their brains, which doesn't support the notion that big brains promote social networking.

The model of males as both providers and protectors is criticized for the impossibility of being in two places at once; the male cannot both protect his family at home and be out hunting at the same time. In the case of the claim that a provider male could buy protection service for his family from other males by bartering food that he had hunted, critics point at the fact that the most valuable food (the food that contained the rarest essential nutrients) would be different in different ecologies. As such, valuable foods may be primarily vegetable in some geographical areas and animal in others, making it impossible for hunting styles relying on physical strength or risk-taking to be universally of similar value.

A contradiction also exists between evolutionary psychology's claim that men need to assess a mate's sexual viability more than women. Further, the claim that male sexual jealousy guards against infidelity is also criticized, as it would be pointless for a male to be fast to assess female fertility if he needed to assess the risk of there being a jealous male nearby. In that case, his chances of defeating him before mating would have to be assessed.

== Standard social science model ==
Evolutionary psychology has been entangled in the broader philosophical and social-science controversies surrounding nature versus nurture debate. Evolutionary psychologists typically contrast evolutionary psychology with what they call the standard social science model (SSSM). They characterize the SSSM as the "blank slate", "relativist", "social constructionist", and "cultural determinist" perspective that dominated the social sciences throughout the 20th century and assumed that the mind was shaped almost entirely by culture. Critics have argued that evolutionary psychologists created a false dichotomy between their own view and the caricature of the SSSM. Other critics regard the SSSM as a rhetorical device or a straw man and suggest that the scientists whom evolutionary psychologists associate with the SSSM did not believe that the mind was a blank slate devoid of any natural predispositions.

=== Reductionism and determinism ===
Some critics view evolutionary psychology as a form of genetic reductionism and genetic determinism, a common critique being that evolutionary psychology does not address the complexity of individual development and experience and fails to explain the influence of genes on behavior in individual cases. Evolutionary psychologists respond that they work within a nature-nurture interactionist framework that acknowledges that many psychological adaptations are facultative (sensitive to environmental variations during individual development). The discipline is generally not focused on proximate analyses of behavior; rather, it focuses on the study of distal/ultimate causality (the evolution of psychological adaptations). The field of behavioral genetics focuses on the proximate influence of genes on behavior.

=== Testability of hypotheses ===
Evolutionary psychology's scientific credibility suffers from common criticisms that its hypotheses are untestable and arbitrary. For example, many current traits likely evolved for purposes other than their current ones. Therefore, since infinite explanations could exist for a trait's evolution, critics argue that pinpointing the precise reason is impossible.

Although evolutionary psychology hypotheses are hard to verify, evolutionary psychologists maintain that verification is possible.

Testing ideas about the evolutionary origins of psychological phenomena is indeed a challenging task, but not an impossible one.

Part of the critique of the scientific base of evolutionary psychology includes a critique of the concept of the Environment of Evolutionary Adaptation (EEA). Some critics have argued that researchers know so little about the environment in which Homo sapiens evolved that explaining specific traits as an adaptation to that environment becomes highly speculative. Evolutionary psychologists respond that they do know many things about this environment, including that present-day humans' ancestors were hunter-gatherers, and that they generally lived in small tribes.

Edward Hagen argues that the human past environments were not radically different in the same sense as the Carboniferous or Jurassic periods and that the animal and plant taxa of the era were similar to those of the modern world, as was the geology and ecology. Hagen argues that few would deny that other organs evolved in the EEA (for example, lungs evolving in an oxygen-rich atmosphere), yet critics question whether the brain's EEA is truly knowable, which he argues constitutes selective scepticism. Hagen also argues that most evolutionary psychology research rests on the fact that females can get pregnant and males cannot, which Hagen observes was also true in the EEA.

John Alcock describes this as the "No Time Machine Argument": critics argue that since it is not possible to travel back in time to the EEA, then it cannot be determined what was going on there, and thus what was adaptive. Alcock argues that present-day evidence allows researchers to be reasonably confident about the conditions of the EEA and that the fact that so many human behaviours are adaptive in the current environment is evidence that the ancestral environment of humans had much in common with the present one, as these behaviours would have evolved in the ancestral environment. Thus, Alcock concludes that researchers can make predictions on the adaptive value of traits. Similarly, Dominic Murphy argues that alternative explanations cannot merely just be forwarded but instead need their own evidence and predictions – if one explanation makes predictions that the others cannot, it is reasonable to have confidence in that explanation. In addition, Murphy argues that other historical sciences also make predictions about future phenomena to develop explanations about past phenomena. For example, cosmologists look for evidence of what we would expect to see in modern times if the Big Bang were true, while geologists make predictions about modern phenomena to determine if an asteroid wiped out the dinosaurs. Murphy argues that if other historical disciplines can conduct tests without a time machine, then the onus is on the critics to show why evolutionary psychology is untestable if other historical disciplines are not, as "methods should be judged across the board, not singled out for ridicule in one context."

=== Modularity of mind ===
Evolutionary psychologists generally presume that, like the body, the mind is composed of many evolved modular adaptations, although there is some disagreement within the discipline regarding the degree of general plasticity, or "generality," of some modules. One suggestion for the evolution of modularity is that it offered greater fitness and reduced connection costs than non-modular networks.

In contrast, some academics argue that it is unnecessary to posit highly domain-specific modules and suggest that the brain's neural anatomy supports a model based on more domain-general faculties and processes. Moreover, empirical support for the domain-specific theory stems almost entirely from performance on variations of the Wason selection task, which is extremely limited in scope as it tests only one subtype of deductive reasoning.

=== Cultural rather than genetic development of cognitive tools ===
Psychologist Cecilia Heyes has argued that the picture presented by some evolutionary psychology of the human mind as a collection of cognitive instincts – organs of thought shaped by genetic evolution over very long time periods – does not fit the research results. She posits instead that humans have cognitive gadgets – "special-purpose organs of thought" built in the course of development through social interaction. Similar criticisms are articulated by Subrena E. Smith of the University of New Hampshire.

=== Response by evolutionary psychologists ===
Evolutionary psychologists have addressed many of their critics (e.g., in books by Segerstråle, Barlow, and Alcock.). Among their rebuttals are that some criticisms are straw men, or are based on an incorrect nature versus nurture dichotomy, or on basic misunderstandings of the discipline.

Robert Kurzban suggested that "...critics of the field, when they err, are not slightly missing the mark. Their confusion is profound. It's not like they are marksmen who can't quite hit the center of the target; they're holding the gun backwards." Many have written specifically to correct basic misconceptions.

== See also ==
- Behavioural genetics
- Biocultural evolution
- Biosocial criminology
- Darwinian Happiness
- Darwinian literary studies
- Deep social mind
- Dunbar's number
- Evolution of the brain
- List of evolutionary psychologists
- Evolutionary origin of religions
- God gene
- Evolutionary psychiatry
- Evolutionary psychology and culture
- Primate cognition
- Hominid intelligence
- Chimpanzee intelligence
- Cooperative eye hypothesis
- Origin of language
- Origin of speech
- Social exchange theory
- Ovulatory shift hypothesis
- Neuroethology
- r/K selection theory
- Sociobiology
- Universal Darwinism

== Bibliography ==
=== Books ===
—A—

- Alcock, John (2001). The triumph of sociobiology. Oxford; New York: Oxford University Press. ISBN 978-0-19-514383-6.

—B—

- Baars, Bernard J. (30 July 1993). A Cognitive Theory of Consciousness. Cambridge University Press. ISBN 978-0-521-42743-2.
- Barkow, Jerome H.; Cosmides, L.; Tooby, J. (1992). The adapted mind: Evolutionary psychology and the generation of culture. Oxford: Oxford University Press.
- Barkow, Jerome H. (2006). Missing the Revolution: Darwinism for Social Scientists. Oxford University Press, US. ISBN 978-0-19-513002-7.
- Barrett, Deirdre (17 June 2007). Waistland. W. W. Norton & Company. ISBN 978-0-393-06216-8.
- Barrett, Deirdre (26 January 2010). Supernormal Stimuli: How Primal Urges Overran Their Evolutionary Purpose. W. W. Norton & Company. ISBN 978-0-393-06848-1.
- Bowlby, John (1969). Attachment. New York: Basic Books. ISBN 978-0-465-09715-9.
- Brown, Donald E. (1991). Human Universals. New York: McGraw-Hill.
- Buller, David J.; Hardcastle, Valerie Gray (2005). "Modularity". In Buller, David J. (ed.). Adapting Minds: Evolutionary Psychology and the Persistent Quest For Human Nature. Cambridge, Massachusetts: MIT Press. pp. 127–201. ISBN 978-0-262-02579-9.
- Buller, David J. (2005). Adapting minds: evolutionary psychology and the persistent quest for human nature. Cambridge, Mass: MIT Press. pp. 134–135. ISBN 978-0-262-02579-9.
- Buller, David J. (2006). Adapting Minds: Evolutionary Psychology and the Persistent Quest for Human Nature. MIT Press. p. 8.
- Buss, David (2004). Evolutionary Psychology: The New Science of the Mind. Boston: Pearson Education, Inc. ISBN 978-0-205-48338-9.
- Buss, D.M. (2005a) [1998]. The Handbook of Evolutionary Psychology. Wiley. ISBN 978-0-471-72722-4.
- Buss, David M. (2005b) [1998]. "Evolutionary Psychology: Foundations". In David Buss (ed.). The Handbook of Evolutionary Psychology. New York: Wiley. pp. 5–67. ISBN 978-0-471-72722-4.
- Buss, David (2015). Evolutionary psychology: the new science of the mind. Boca Raton, FL: Psychology Press, an imprint of Taylor and Francis. ISBN 978-1-317-34572-5. OCLC 1082202213.
- Buss, David M. (2019) [2015]. Evolutionary psychology: the new science of the mind (6th ed.). New York: Routledge. ISBN 978-1-138-08818-4. OCLC 1084632387.

—C—

- Clutton-Brock, T. H. (21 March 1991). The Evolution of Parental Care. Princeton University Press. p. 9. ISBN 978-0-691-02516-2.
- Cosmides, Leda; Tooby, John (1992). "Cognitive Adaptations for Social Exchange". The Adapted Mind: Evolutionary Psychology and the Generation of Culture. New York: Oxford University Press. pp. 163–228.

—D—

- Daly, Martin; Wilson, Margo (1 January 1999). The Truth about Cinderella: A Darwinian View of Parental Love. Yale University Press. ISBN 978-0-300-08029-2.
- Darwin, Charles (1871). The Descent of Man, and Selection in Relation to Sex. Vol. 1 (1st ed.). London: John Murray.
- Darwin, Charles (1872) [1859]. The Origin of Species: By Means of Natural Selection Or the Preservation of Favored Races in the Struggle for Life. The modern library of the world's best books. Modern Library.
- Dawkins, Richard (1999). The Extended Phenotype: The Long Reach of the Gene. Oxford University Press. ISBN 978-0-19-288051-2.
- Dawkins, Richard (1989). "6". The Selfish Gene. Oxford University Press. ISBN 978-0-19-286092-7.
- Deacon, Terrence W. (17 April 1998). The Symbolic Species. W. W. Norton & Company. ISBN 978-0-393-34302-1.
- Diller, Karl; Cann, Rebecca (2023). "Evidence against a genetic-based revolution in language 50,000 years ago". In Rudolf P. Botha; Chris Knight (eds.). The Cradle of Language. Oxford: Oxford University Press. pp. 135–149. ISBN 978-1-383-04519-2.
- Durrant, R.; Ellis, B.J. (2003). "Evolutionary Psychology". In Gallagher, M.; Nelson, R.J. (eds.). Comprehensive Handbook of Psychology, Volume Three: Biological Psychology. New York: Wiley & Sons. pp. 1–33.
- Dunbar, Robin Ian MacDonald; Barrett, Louise (2007). Oxford Handbook of Evolutionary Psychology. Oxford University Press. ISBN 978-0-19-856830-8.

—F—

- Figueredo, Aurelio J.; Gladden, Paul R.; Hohman, Zachary (2012). "The evolutionary psychology of criminal behaviour". In S. Craig Roberts (ed.). Applied evolutionary psychology. Oxford: Oxford University Press. pp. 201–221.
- Fitch, W. Tecumseh (1 April 2010). The Evolution of Language. Cambridge University Press. ISBN 978-1-139-48706-1.
- Frankenhuis, Willem E. (2021). "Environmental Unpredictability". Encyclopedia of Evolutionary Psychological Science. Springer, Cham. doi:10.1007/978-3-319-19650-3_1920#citeas. ISBN 978-3-319-19650-3.
- Freeman, Scott; Herron, Jon C. (2007). Evolutionary Analysis. Pearson Prentice Hall. ISBN 978-0-13-227584-2.

—G—

- Gallagher, Michela (3 January 2003). B, Irving (ed.). HANDBOOK of PSYCHOLOGY. Wiley. p. 1. ISBN 0-471-38408-9.
- Gaulin, Steven J. C.; McBurney, Donald (2004). Evolutionary Psychology. Pearson/Prentice Hall. ISBN 978-0-13-111529-3.

—H—

- Hagan, Edward (2005). "5 – Controversial Issues in Evolutionary Psychology". In David Buss (ed.). The Handbook of Evolutionary Psychology. Hoboken, New Jersey: John Wiley & Sons, Inc. pp. 145–173.
- Hewlett, Barry S.; Lamb, Michael E. (2005). Walter Koenig (ed.). Hunter-gatherer Childhoods: Evolutionary, Developmental, & Cultural Perspectives. Aldine Transaction. ISBN 978-0-202-30749-7.

—K—

- Kalat, James W. (2012). Biological Psychology (11th ed.). Cengage Learning.
- Kurzban, Robert (2011). Why Everyone (Else) Is a Hypocrite: Evolution and the Modular Mind. NJ: Princeton University Press. ISBN 978-0-691-14674-4.

—L—

- Laland, Kevin N.; Brown, Gillian R. (2002). Sense & Nonsense: Evolutionary Perspectives on Human Behavior. Oxford: Oxford University Press. pp. 287–319.
- Levine, John M.; Kameda, Tatsuya (12 October 2012). "Chapter 10 - Evolution and Groups". Group Processes. Psychology Press. ISBN 978-1-135-25425-4.
- Longe, Jacqueline L. (11 May 2016). The Gale Encyclopedia of Psychology (3rd ed.). Gale Research Incorporated. pp. 386–388. ISBN 978-1-4144-1204-7.

—M—

- Miller, Geoffrey (17 April 2001). The Mating Mind: How Sexual Choice Shaped the Evolution of Human Nature. Knopf Doubleday Publishing Group. ISBN 978-0-385-49517-2.
- Murphy, Dominic (2003). "Adaptationism and Psychological Explanation". Evolutionary Psychology: Alternative Approaches. Boston, MA: Springer US. pp. 161–184. doi:10.1007/978-1-4615-0267-8_8#bib1. ISBN 978-1-4615-0267-8.
- Maryanski, Alexandra; Machalek, Richard; Turner, Jonathan H. (17 November 2015). Handbook on Evolution and Society: Toward an Evolutionary Social Science. Routledge. ISBN 978-1-317-25833-9.
- Maiers, Wolfgang (2003). "The Bogus Claim of Evolutionary Psychology". In Stephenson, Niamh (ed.). Theoretical Psychology: Critical Contributions. Concord, Ont.: Captus University Publications. pp. 426–435. ISBN 978-1-55322-055-8.

—N—

- Narvaez, Darcia (2013). The Evolved Developmental Niche and Children's Developing Morality. New York: Springer.
- Nesse, Randolph; Williams, George C. (1996). Why We Get Sick. NY: Vintage. "adaptationist perspective to both physiological and psychological dysfunctions"
- Neuberg, Steven L.; Kenrick, Douglas T.; Schaller, Mark (2010). "Evolutionary social psychology". In Susan T. Fiske; Daniel T. Gilbert; Gardner Lindzey (eds.). Handbook of social psychology. Vol. 2 (5th ed.). New York: John Wiley & Sons. pp. 761–796.

—O—

- O'Brien, David; Manfrinati, Angela (2010). "The Mental Logic Theory of Conditional Propositions". In Oaksford, Mike; Chater, Nick (eds.). Cognition and Conditionals: Probability and Logic in Human Thinking. New York: Oxford University Press. pp. 39–54. ISBN 978-0-19-923329-8.

—P—

- Pinker, Steven (1995). The Language Instinct: The New Science of Language and Mind. Penguin Adult. ISBN 978-0-14-017529-5.
- Pinker, Steven (1997). How the mind works. New York: Norton. ISBN 978-0-393-04535-2.
- Pinker, Steven (2002). The blank slate: the modern denial of human nature. New York, N.Y: Viking. ISBN 978-0-670-03151-1.
- Plotkin, Henry (2004). Evolutionary Thought in Psychology: A Brief History. Malden, MA: Blackwell. pp. 149–150.

—R—

- Richardson, Robert C. (2007). Evolutionary Psychology As Maladapted Psychology. Cambridge, Massachusetts: MIT Press. p. 176. ISBN 978-0-262-18260-7.
- Rose, Hilary; Rose, Steven (2000). "Introduction". Alas, Poor Darwin: Arguments against Evolutionary Psychology. New York: Harmony Books. pp. 1–13. ISBN 978-0-609-60513-4.

—S—

- Sampson, Geoffrey (2009). The "Language Instinct" Debate: Revised Edition. London: Continuum. pp. 134–445. ISBN 978-0-8264-7384-4.
- Santrock, John W. (2005). A Topical Approach to Life-Span Development with PowerWeb. McGraw-Hill Higher Education. ISBN 978-0-07-322876-1.
- Schacter (10 December 2010). Psychology 2nd Ed. Worth Publishers. ISBN 978-1-4292-3719-2.
- Schaller, Mark; Simpson, Jeff A.; Kenrick, Douglas T. (2006). yes (ed.). Evolution and social psychology. New York: Psychology Press.
- Seethaler, Nils (2015). "Discrepant Explanatory Approaches in Anthropology and Evolutionary Psychology to the Phenomenon of Visual Art". In Benjamin P. Lange; Sascha Schwarz (eds.). Human Psyche between Nature and Culture. Berlin. pp. 74–82.
- Segerstråle, Ullica Christina Olofsdotter (2000). Defenders of the truth: the battle for science in the sociobiology debate and beyond. Oxford, New York: Oxford University Press. ISBN 0-19-850505-1.
- Solomon, Sheldon; et al. (2004). "Human Awareness of Mortality and the Evolution of Culture". In Schaller, Mark; Crandall, Christian S (eds.). The Psychological Foundations of Culture. Mahwah, N.J.: Lawrence Erlbaum Associates. p. 17. ISBN 978-0-8058-3839-8.
- Spielman, Rose M.; Jenkins, William J.; Lovett, Marilyn D. (2020). Psychology 2e. OpenStax. ISBN 978-1-951693-23-7.
- Sulloway, F. (1996). Born to rebel. NY: Pantheon. ISBN 978-0-679-44232-5.
- Symons, Donald (1992). "On the use and misuse of Darwinism in the study of human behavior". The Adapted Mind: Evolutionary psychology and the generation of culture. Oxford University Press. pp. 137–59. ISBN 978-0-19-510107-2.
- Szocik, Konrad; Eyghen, Hans Van (12 January 2021). Revising Cognitive and Evolutionary Science of Religion: Religion as an Adaptation. Springer Nature. ISBN 978-3-030-63516-9.

—T—

- Tooby, John; Barrett, H. Clark (14 July 2005). "Resolving the Debate on Innate Ideas: Learnability Constraints and the Evolved Interpenetration of Motivational and Conceptual Functions". The Innate Mind. Oxford University PressNew York. doi:10.1093/acprof:oso/9780195179675.003.0018. ISBN 978-0-19-517967-5.
- Tooby, J.; Cosmides, L. (2005). "Conceptual foundations of evolutionary psychology". In Buss, D.M. (ed.). The Handbook of Evolutionary Psychology (PDF). Hoboken, NJ: Wiley. Archived from the original (PDF) on 17 December 2018.
- Trivers, Robert L. (1972). "2 Parental investment and sexual selection". Sexual Selection and the Descent of Man, 1871-1971. Edited by Bernard Campbell. Chicago, IL: Aldine Publishing. pp. 136–179. ISBN 0-202-02005-3.

—V—

- Van Regenmortel, Marc H. V.; Hull, David L. (2003). Promises and Limits of Reductionism in the Biomedical Sciences. Hoboken: Wiley. ISBN 0-471-49850-5.
- Vugt, Mark Van; Ahuja, Anjana (18 January 2011). Naturally Selected: The Evolutionary Science of Leadership. HarperCollins. pp. 74–95. doi:10.1177/2041386613493635. ISBN 978-0-06-196383-4. S2CID 145773713.

—W—

- Wallace, Brendan (2010). Getting Darwin Wrong: Why Evolutionary Psychology Won't Work. Exeter: Imprint Academic. p. 136. ISBN 978-1-84540-207-5.
- Wilson, Glenn Daniel (1981). Love and Instinct. Temple Smith. ISBN 978-0-85117-209-5.
- Workman, Lance; Reader, Will (20 May 2004). Evolutionary Psychology: An Introduction. Cambridge University Press. ISBN 978-0-521-80532-2.
- Workman, Lance; Reader, Will (19 June 2008). Evolutionary Psychology: An Introduction. Cambridge University Press. ISBN 978-0-521-88836-3.
- Wright, Robert (29 August 1995). The Moral Animal: Why We Are, the Way We Are: The New Science of Evolutionary Psychology. Knopf Doubleday Publishing Group. ISBN 978-0-679-76399-4.
- Williams, George C. (1966). Adaptation and Natural Selection: A Critique of Some Current Evolutionary Thought. Princeton: Princeton University Press. p. 4.
- Wilson, Edward O. (1978). On Human Nature. Cambridge, MA: Harvard University Press.
- Wilson, Edward O. (1975). Sociobiology: The New Synthesis. Belknap Press of Harvard University Press. ISBN 978-0-674-81621-3.
- Wilson, Edward O. (2000). Sociobiology: the new synthesis. Cambridge, Mass: Belknap Press of Harvard University Press. ISBN 0-674-00089-7.

=== Journals ===
- Beer, Colin (23 August 1998). "Definition & Facts". Encyclopædia Britannica.
- Belke, Terry W.; Garland, Theodore (2007). "A BRIEF OPPORTUNITY TO RUN DOES NOT FUNCTION AS A REINFORCER FOR MICE SELECTED FOR HIGH DAILY WHEEL‐RUNNING RATES". Journal of the Experimental Analysis of Behavior. 88 (2): 199–213. doi:10.1901/jeab.2007.62-06. ISSN 0022-5002. PMC 1986434. PMID 17970415.
- Bouchard, Thomas J. (2004). "Genetic Influence on Human Psychological Traits: A Survey". Current Directions in Psychological Science. 13 (4): 148–151. doi:10.1111/j.0963-7214.2004.00295.x. ISSN 0963-7214.
- Buss, D. M.; Barnes, M. (1986). "Preferences in human mate selection" (PDF). Journal of Personality and Social Psychology. 50 (3): 559–570. doi:10.1037/0022-3514.50.3.559.
- Buss, David M. (1988). "From vigilance to violence". Ethology and Sociobiology. 9 (5): 291–317. doi:10.1016/0162-3095(88)90010-6.
- Buss, D. M. (1989). "Conflict between the sexes: strategic interference and the evocation of anger and upset". Journal of Personality and Social Psychology. 56 (5): 735–747. doi:10.1037/0022-3514.56.5.735. PMID 2724067.
- Buss, D. M.; Larsen, R. J.; Westen, D.; Semmelroth, J. (1992). "Sex differences in jealousy: Evolution, physiology, and psychology" (PDF). An International Journal for the Advancement of Psychological Theory.
- Buss, D. M.; Schmitt, D. P. (1993). "Sexual strategies theory: an evolutionary perspective on human mating". Psychological Review. 100 (2): 204–232. doi:10.1037/0033-295x.100.2.204. PMID 8483982.
- Buss, David M.; Haselton, Martie G.; Shackelford, Todd K.; Bleske, April L.; Wakefield, Jerome C. (1998). "Adaptations, Exaptations, and Spandrels". American Psychologist. 53: 533–548. Archived from the original on 21 October 2002.
- Buss, David M.; Schmitt, David P.; Shackelford, Todd K.; Kirkpatrick, Lindsay D.; Larsen, James O. (1998). "Strategic pluralism and human mating". Behavioral and Brain Sciences. 21 (4): 595–599. doi:10.1017/S0140525X98001767.
- Caporael, Linnda R.; Brewer, Marilynn B. (1991). "The Quest for Human Nature: Social and Scientific Issues in Evolutionary Psychology". Journal of Social Issues. 47 (3): 1–9. doi:10.1111/j.1540-4560.1991.tb01819.x. ISSN 0022-4537.
- Carmen, R., Geher, G., Glass, D., Guitar, A., Grandis, T., Johnsen, L., Philip, M., Newmark, R., Trouton, G., Tauber, B. (2013). "The Journal of the Evolutionary Studies Consortium THEORETICAL CONTRIBUTION Evolution Integrated Across All Islands of the Human Behavioral Archipelago: All Psychology as Evolutionary Psychology" (PDF). EvoS Journal: The Journal of the Evolutionary Studies Consortium. 5 (1): 108.
- Chiappe, Dan; MacDonald, Kevin (2005). "The Evolution of Domain-General Mechanisms in Intelligence and Learning". The Journal of General Psychology. 132 (1): 5–40. doi:10.3200/GENP.132.1.5-40. ISSN 0022-1309.
- Clune, Jeff; Mouret, Jean-Baptiste; Lipson, Hod (22 March 2013). "The evolutionary origins of modularity". Proceedings of the Royal Society B: Biological Sciences. 280 (1755). doi:10.1098/rspb.2012.2863. ISSN 0962-8452. PMC 3574393. PMID 23363632.
- Confer, Jaime C.; Easton, Judith A.; Fleischman, Diana S.; Goetz, Cari D.; Lewis, David M. G.; Perilloux, Carin; Buss, David M. (2010). "Evolutionary psychology: Controversies, questions, prospects, and limitations". American Psychologist. 65 (2): 110–126. doi:10.1037/a0018413. ISSN 1935-990X.
- Cosmides, L.; Tooby, J. (1999). "Toward an evolutionary taxonomy of treatable conditions". Journal of Abnormal Psychology. 108 (3): 453–464. doi:10.1037/0021-843X.108.3.453. PMID 10466269.
- Davies, Paul Sheldon; Fetzer, James H.; Foster, Thomas R. (1995). "Logical reasoning and domain specificity: A critique of the social exchange theory of reasoning". Biology & Philosophy. 10 (1): 1–37. doi:10.1007/BF00851985. ISSN 0169-3867.
- Duntley, Joshua D.; Buss, David M. (16 January 2008). "Evolutionary Psychology Is a Metatheory for Psychology". Psychological Inquiry. 19 (1): 30–34. doi:10.1080/10478400701774105. ISSN 1047-840X.
- Eccles, J C (15 August 1992). "Evolution of consciousness". Proceedings of the National Academy of Sciences. 89 (16): 7320–7324. doi:10.1073/pnas.89.16.7320. ISSN 0027-8424. PMC 49701. PMID 1502142.
- Eldakar, Omar Tonsi; Wilson, David Sloan (13 May 2008). "Selfishness as second-order altruism". Proceedings of the National Academy of Sciences. 105 (19): 6982–6986. doi:10.1073/pnas.0712173105. ISSN 0027-8424. PMC 2383986. PMID 18448681.
- Eldakar, Omar Tonsi; Wilson, David Sloan; O'Gorman, Rick (1 January 2006). "Emotions and Actions Associated with Altruistic Helping and Punishment". Evolutionary Psychology. 4 (1). doi:10.1177/147470490600400123. ISSN 1474-7049.
- Gangestad, Steven W.; Simpson, Jeffry A.; Cousins, Alita J.; Garver-Apgar, Christine E.; Christensen, P. Niels (2004). "Women's Preferences for Male Behavioral Displays Change Across the Menstrual Cycle" (PDF). Psychological Science. 15 (3): 203–207. doi:10.1111/j.0956-7976.2004.01503010.x. ISSN 0956-7976. Archived from the original on 16 February 2012.
- Geher, G. (2006). "Evolutionary psychology is not evil! ... and here's why ... Psihologijske Teme (Psychological Topics)". "Special Issue on Evolutionary Psychology, 15, 181–202"
- Gintis, H. (2000). "Strong Reciprocity and Human Sociality". Journal of Theoretical Biology. 206 (2): 169–179. Bibcode:2000JThBi.206..169G. doi:10.1006/jtbi.2000.2111. PMID 10966755. S2CID 9260305.
- Hagen, Edward H.; Hammerstein, Peter (2006). "Game theory and human evolution: A critique of some recent interpretations of experimental games". Theoretical Population Biology. 69 (3): 339–348. doi:10.1016/j.tpb.2005.09.005.
- Hagen, Edward H. (2014). "Invariant world, invariant mind: Evolutionary psychology and its critics". Evolutionary Psychology. 12 (1): 1–15. doi:10.1177/147470491401200101.
- Haselton, Martie G.; Miller, Geoffrey F. (2006). "Women's fertility across the cycle increases the short-term attractiveness of creative intelligence". Human Nature. 17 (1): 50–73. doi:10.1007/s12110-006-1020-0. ISSN 1045-6767.
- Henrich, J.; Chudek, M. (2012). "Understanding the research program". Behavioral and Brain Sciences. 35 (1): 29–30. doi:10.1017/S0140525X11001397. PMID 22289319. S2CID 39959479.
- Hunt, Lynn (2014). "The Self and Its History". The American Historical Review. 119 (5): 1576–1586. doi:10.1093/ahr/119.5.1576. ISSN 1937-5239.
- Jacobson, Nicholas C. (2016). "Current evolutionary adaptiveness of psychiatric disorders: Fertility rates, parent−child relationship quality, and psychiatric disorders across the lifespan". Journal of Abnormal Psychology. 125 (6): 824–839. doi:10.1037/abn0000185. ISSN 1939-1846. PMC 4980185. PMID 27362490.
- Johnson, John A. (22 October 2011). "What Anti-Evolutionary Psychologists are Really Worried About". Psychology Today.
- Kenrick, Douglas T.; Griskevicius, VIadas; Mahmoud, Omar (2016). "The Rational Animal: How Evolution made us Smarter than we Think". International Journal of Market Research. 58 (2): 333–335. doi:10.2501/IJMR-2016-018. ISSN 1470-7853.
- Koenig, Walter; Dickinson, Janis (23 January 2011). "animal social behavior". Encyclopædia Britannica.
- Kurzban, R. (11 July 2013). "This One Goes to Eleven, PZ Myers, and Other Punch Lines – Evolutionary Psychology Blog Archive". web.sas.upenn.edu.
- Levy, Neil (2004). "Evolutionary Psychology, Human Universals, and the Standard Social Science Model". Biology and Philosophy. 19 (3): 459–472. doi:10.1023/B:BIPH.0000036111.64561.63. ISSN 0169-3867.
- Li, Norman P.; Bailey, J. Michael; Kenrick, Douglas T.; Linsenmeier, Joan A. W. (2002). "The necessities and luxuries of mate preferences: Testing the tradeoffs". Journal of Personality and Social Psychology. 82 (6): 947–955. doi:10.1037/0022-3514.82.6.947. ISSN 1939-1315.
- Lienard, P.; Boyer, P. (2006). "Whence collective rituals? A cultural selection model of ritualized behavior". American Anthropologist. 108 (4): 824–827. doi:10.1525/aa.2006.108.4.814. -->
- Lima, F.W.S.; Hadzibeganovic, Tarik; Stauffer, Dietrich (2009). "Evolution of ethnocentrism on undirected and directed Barabási–Albert networks". Physica A: Statistical Mechanics and its Applications. 388 (24): 4999–5004. doi:10.1016/j.physa.2009.08.029.
- Lopez, Anthony C.; McDermott, Rose; Petersen, Michael Bang (2011). "States in Mind: Evolution, Coalitional Psychology, and International Politics". International Security. 36 (2): 48–83. doi:10.1162/ISEC_a_00056. ISSN 0162-2889.
- Mealey, Linda (1995). "The sociobiology of sociopathy: An integrated evolutionary model". Behavioral and Brain Sciences. 18 (3): 523–541. doi:10.1017/S0140525X00039595. ISSN 0140-525X.
- Morin, Oliver (7 March 2016). "I can't believe it's evolutionary psychology!".
- Narvaez, Darcia; Wang, Lijuan; Gleason, Tracy; Cheng, Ying; Lefever, Jennifer; Deng, Lifang (2013). "The evolved developmental niche and child sociomoral outcomes in Chinese 3-year-olds". European Journal of Developmental Psychology. 10 (2): 106–127. doi:10.1080/17405629.2012.761606. ISSN 1740-5629.
- Nichols, Shaun; Grantham, Todd (2000). "Adaptive Complexity and Phenomenal Consciousness". Philosophy of Science. 67 (4): 648–670. doi:10.1086/392859. ISSN 0031-8248.
- O'Connell, Henry (2004). "Evolutionary theory in psychiatry and psychology". Irish Journal of Psychological Medicine. 21 (1). Cambridge University Press (CUP): 37–37. doi:10.1017/s0790966700008193. ISSN 0790-9667.
- Öhman, Arne; Mineka, Susan (2001). "Fears, phobias, and preparedness: Toward an evolved module of fear and fear learning". Psychological Review. 108 (3): 483–522. doi:10.1037/0033-295X.108.3.483. ISSN 1939-1471.
- Panksepp, Jaak; Panksepp, Jules B. (2000). "The Seven Sins of Evolutionary Psychology" (PDF). Evolution and Cognition. 6 (2): 108–131.
- Peters, Frederic (2010). "Consciousness as recursive, spatiotemporal self-location". Psychological Research PRPF. 74 (4): 407–421. doi:10.1007/s00426-009-0258-7. ISSN 0340-0727.
- Pinker, Steven (1999). "How the Mind Works". Annals of the New York Academy of Sciences. 882 (1): 119–127. doi:10.1111/j.1749-6632.1999.tb08538.x. ISSN 0077-8923.
- Ryle, Anthony (2005). "THE RELEVANCE OF EVOLUTIONARY PSYCHOLOGY FOR PSYCHOTHERAPY". British Journal of Psychotherapy. 21 (3): 375–388. doi:10.1111/j.1752-0118.2005.tb00225.x. ISSN 0265-9883.
- Rubin, Paul H. (2003). "Folk economics". Southern Economic Journal. 70 (1): 157–171. doi:10.2307/1061637. JSTOR 1061637.
- Saad, Gad (22 June 2009). "The Never-Ending Misconceptions About Evolutionary Psychology". Psychology Today.
- Schacter, Daniel L.; Addis, Donna Rose; Buckner, Randy L. (2007). "Remembering the past to imagine the future: the prospective brain". Nature Reviews Neuroscience. 8 (9): 657–661. doi:10.1038/nrn2213. ISSN 1471-003X.
- Schmitt, David P.; Buss, David M. (2001). "Human mate poaching: Tactics and temptations for infiltrating existing mateships". Journal of Personality and Social Psychology. 80 (6): 894–917. doi:10.1037/0022-3514.80.6.894. ISSN 1939-1315.
- Schmitt, David P.; Long, Audrey E.; McPhearson, Allante; O'Brien, Kirby; Remmert, Brooke; Shah, Seema H. (2017). "Personality and gender differences in global perspective". International Journal of Psychology. 52 (S1): 45–56. doi:10.1002/ijop.12265. ISSN 0020-7594.
- Shackelford, T.K.; Schmitt, D.P.; Buss, D.M. (2005). "Universal dimensions of human mate preferences; Personality and Individual Differences 39". "447–458"
- Sims, C. A. (2001). "Revisiting evolutionary psychology and psychiatry". British Journal of Psychiatry. 179 (6). Royal College of Psychiatrists: 558–559. doi:10.1192/bjp.179.6.558-b. ISSN 0007-1250.
- Sloman, L (April 2003). "Evolved mechanisms in depression: the role and interaction of attachment and social rank in depression". Journal of Affective Disorders. 74 (2): 107–121. doi:10.1016/S0165-0327(02)00116-7. PMID 12706512.
- Sosis, R.; Alcorta, C. (2003). "Signaling, solidarity, and the sacred: the evolution of religious behavior". Evolutionary Anthropology. 12 (6): 264–274. doi:10.1002/evan.10120. S2CID 443130.
- Tooby, John; Cosmides, Leda (1990). "The past explains the present". Ethology and Sociobiology. 11 (4–5): 375–424. doi:10.1016/0162-3095(90)90017-Z.
- Trivers, R. L. (1971). "The Evolution of Reciprocal Altruism". The Quarterly Review of Biology. 46 (1): 35–57. doi:10.1086/406755. JSTOR 2822435. S2CID 19027999.
- Van Vugt, Mark; Schaller, Mark (2008). "Evolutionary approaches to group dynamics: An introduction". Group Dynamics: Theory, Research, and Practice. 12 (1): 1–6. doi:10.1037/1089-2699.12.1.1. ISSN 1930-7802.
- Wilcox, A. J.; Dunson, D. B.; Weinberg, C. R.; Trussell, J.; Baird, D. D. (2001). "Likelihood of conception with a single act of intercourse: Providing benchmark rates for assessment of post-coital contraceptives". Contraception. 63 (4): 211–215. doi:10.1016/S0010-7824(01)00191-3. PMID 11376648.
- Wilson, David Sloan; Dietrich, Eric; Clark, Anne B. (2003). "On the inappropriate use of the naturalistic fallacy in evolutionary psychology". Biology and Philosophy. 18 (5): 669–681. doi:10.1023/A:1026380825208. ISSN 0169-3867.
