= Collective security =

International security arrangement

Collective security is arrangement between states in which the institution accepts that an attack on one state is the concern of all and merits a collective response to threats by all. Collective security was a key principle underpinning the League of Nations and the United Nations. Collective security is more ambitious than systems of alliance security or collective defense in that it seeks to encompass the totality of states within a region or indeed globally.

The premise of a collective security arrangement is that it serves as a deterrent to aggression by committing an international coalition against any aggressor. While collective security is an idea with a long history, its implementation in practice has proved problematic.

Collective security is also referred to by the phrase "an attack on one is an attack on all". However, usage of this phrase also frequently refers to Article 5 of the North Atlantic Treaty, the collective security provision in NATO's charter.

== History ==
=== Early mentions ===
Collective security is one of the most promising approaches for peace and a valuable device for power management on an international scale. Cardinal Richelieu proposed a scheme for collective security in 1629, which was partially reflected in the 1648 Peace of Westphalia. In the eighteenth century many proposals were made for collective security arrangements, especially in Europe.

The concept of a peaceful community of nations was outlined in 1795 in Immanuel Kant's Perpetual Peace: A Philosophical Sketch. Kant outlined the idea of a league of nations that would control conflict and promote peace between states. However, he argues for the establishment of a peaceful world community not in a sense that there be a global government but in the hope that each state would declare itself as a free state that respects its citizens and welcomes foreign visitors as fellow rational beings. His key argument is that a union of free states would promote peaceful society worldwide: therefore, in his view, there can be a perpetual peace shaped by the international community rather than by a world government.

International cooperation to promote collective security originated in the Concert of Europe that developed after the Napoleonic Wars in the nineteenth century in an attempt to maintain the status quo between European states and so avoid war. This period also saw the development of international law with the first Geneva Conventions establishing laws about humanitarian relief during war and the international Hague Conventions of 1899 and 1907 governing rules of war and the peaceful settlement of international disputes.

European diplomatic alignments shortly before the World War I. Germany and the Ottoman Empire allied after the outbreak of war.

The forerunner of the League of Nations, the Inter-Parliamentary Union (IPU), was formed by peace activists William Randal Cremer and Frédéric Passy in 1889. The organization was international in scope with a third of the members of parliament, in the 24 countries with parliaments, serving as members of the IPU by 1914. Its aims were to encourage governments to solve international disputes by peaceful means and arbitration and annual conferences were held to help governments refine the process of international arbitration. The IPU's structure consisted of a Council headed by a President which would later be reflected in the structure of the League.

At the start of the twentieth century two power blocs emerged through alliances between the European Great Powers. It was these alliances that came into effect at the start of the First World War in 1914, drawing all the major European powers into the war. This was the first major war in Europe between industrialized countries and the first time in Western Europe the results of industrialization (for example mass production) had been dedicated to war. The result of this industrial warfare was an unprecedented casualty level with eight and a half million members of armed services dead, an estimated 21 million wounded, and approximately 10 million civilian deaths.

By the time the fighting ended in November 1918, the war had had a profound impact, affecting the social, political and economic systems of Europe and inflicting psychological and physical damage on the continent. Anti-war sentiment rose across the world; the First World War was described as "the war to end all wars", and its possible causes were vigorously investigated. The causes identified included arms races, alliances, secret diplomacy, and the freedom of sovereign states to enter into war for their own benefit. The perceived remedies to these were seen as the creation of an international organization whose aim was to prevent future war through disarmament, open diplomacy, international co-operation, restrictions on the right to wage wars, and penalties that made war unattractive to nations.

In a 1945 American Political Science Review article, Frederick L. Schuman criticized notions that a new collective security organization could contribute to world peace. Schuman pointed to examples from history of collective security organizations that failed to facilitate world peace. He argued that the organization that would become the United Nations could only facilitate world peace if the United States, the Soviet Union, and the United Kingdom worked in unison, but that the organization would fail if there were divisions between the three powers.

== Theory ==
Collective security can be understood as a security arrangement in which all states cooperate collectively to provide security for all by the actions of all against any states within the groups which might challenge the existing order by using force. That contrasts with self-help strategies of engaging in war for purely-immediate national interest. While collective security is possible, several prerequisites must be met for it to work.

Collective security also contrasts with alliances by different ways. Collective security is based on the perspective of all together in a group against any of them, rather than on unilateral idea of some against specific others. Alliances have the form of two groups against each other, such as states A+B+C against states Y+Z; however, collective security takes the form of conducting one agreement between A+B+C+Y+Z against any of them. It is different from an alliance since collective security is made to focus on internal regulation required universal membership, but alliance is made to deter or reduce an outside threat as an exclusive institution. In an alliance, a state would see its allies as an absolute gain and its enemies as a relative gains without legal obligation. In contrast, collective security follows the case of neutrality, as the whole group is required to punish the aggressor in the hope for it not to violate general norms, which are beyond the states' control, rather than by their self-interest. The opposite of short-term interest where allies fight against a common threat, collective security tends to use universal interests for global peace.

Sovereign nations eager to maintain the status quo willingly co-operate and accept a degree of vulnerability and, in some cases for minor nations, also accede to the interests of the chief contributing nations organizing the collective security. It is achieved by setting up an international co-operative organisation under the auspices of international law, which gives rise to a form of international collective governance, despite being limited in scope and effectiveness. The collective security organisation then becomes an arena for diplomacy, the balance of power, and the exercise of soft power. The use of hard power by states, unless legitimized by the collective security organisation, is considered illegitimate, reprehensible, and necessitating remediation of some kind. The collective security organisation not only gives cheaper security but also may be the only practicable means of security for smaller nations against more powerful threatening neighbours without needing to join the camp of the nations that balance their neighbours.

The concept of "collective security" was pioneered by Baháʼu'lláh, Michael Joseph Savage, Martin Wight, Immanuel Kant, and Woodrow Wilson and was deemed to apply interests in security in a broad manner to "avoid grouping powers into opposing camps, and refusing to draw dividing lines that would leave anyone out." The term "collective security" has also been cited as a principle of the United Nations and earlier the League of Nations. By employing a system of collective security, the United Nations hopes to dissuade any member state from acting in a manner likely to threaten peace and thus avoid a conflict.

Collective security selectively incorporates the concept of both balance of power and global government. However, collective security is not the same as the balance of power, which is important in realism. According to Adreatta, the balance of power focuses on a state's unilateral interests in stopping aggression. Since states look at the world as having a security dilemma because of the fear of relative gain, a state does not want any state to become predominant and so causes a mutually-restraining equilibrium. In other words, the balance of power between states supports the decentralization of power. States are separate actors and do not subordinate their autonomy or sovereignty to a central government. "Singly or in combinations reflecting the coincidence of interests, States seek to influence the pattern of power distribution and to determine their own places within that pattern." The expectations of order and peace come from the belief that competing powers will somehow balance and thereby neutralize one another to produce "deterrence through equilibration." In contrast, under collective security, states share the long term goal of global peace, reversing relationship between individual and community goals mentioned in the balance of power theory, which fails to maintain stability. For example, it led to break down of war during the case of Napoleonic Wars and the World Wars, when states unilaterally decided to be unwilling or unable to fight.

At the same time, the concept of global government is about centralization. Global government is a centralized institutional system that possesses the power use of force like a well-established sovereign nation-state. The concept strips states of their "standing as centers of power and policy, where issues of war and peace are concerned" and superimposes on them "an institution possessed of the authority and capability to maintain, by unchallengeable force so far as may be necessary, the order and stability of a global community." Despite different characteristics of balance of power theory, collective security selectively incorporates both concepts, centralization and decentralization, which can boil down to the phrase "order without government." Thus, collective security seems to be more reliable alternative since it gathers power as a team to punish the aggressor, and it is an attempt to improve international relations and to provide solid rules under anarchy.

=== Basic assumptions ===
Organski (1960) lists five basic assumptions underlying the theory of collective security:

- In an armed conflict, member nation-states can agree on which nation is the aggressor.
- All member nation-states are equally committed to contain and constrain the aggression, irrespective of its source or origin.
- All member nation-states have an identical freedom of action and ability to join in proceedings against the aggressor.
- The cumulative power of the cooperating members of the alliance for collective security is adequate and sufficient to overpower the might of the aggressor.
- In the light of the threat posed by the collective might of the nations of a collective security coalition, the aggressor nation will either modify its policies or be defeated.

=== Prerequisites ===
Morgenthau (1948) states that three prerequisites must be met for collective security to successfully prevent war:

- The collective security system must be able to assemble military force in strength greatly in excess to that assembled by the aggressor(s), thereby deterring the aggressor(s) from attempting to change the world order that is defended by the collective security system.
- Those nations, whose combined strength would be used for deterrence as mentioned in the first prerequisite, should have identical beliefs about the security of the world order that collective security is defending.
- Nations must be willing to subordinate their conflicting interests to the common good defined in terms of the common defense of all member-states.

=== Practices and Violations in International Period and The League of Nations ===
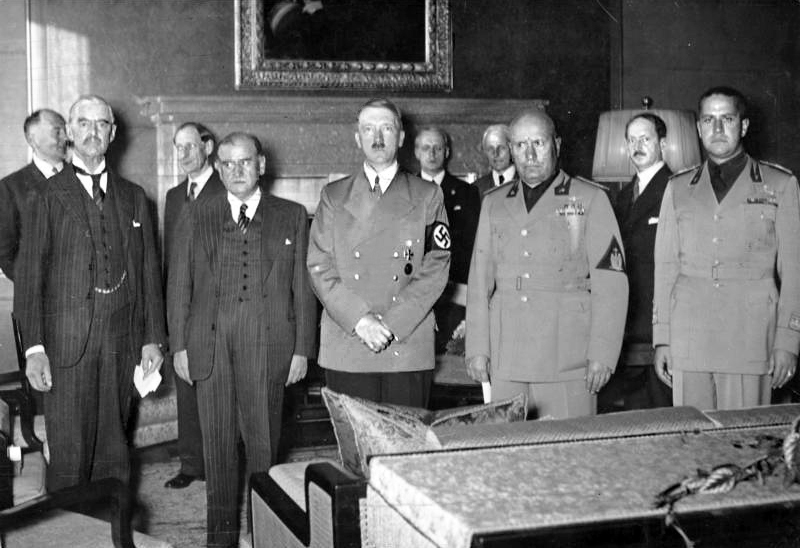
In 1938, France betrayed Czechoslovakia and signed the Munich Agreement with Nazi Germany, effectively dishonoring the French-Czechoslovak alliance.

After World War I, the first large-scale attempt to provide collective security in modern times was the establishment of the League of Nations in 1919 and 1920. The provisions of the League of Nations Covenant represented a weak system for decision making and collective action. According to Palmer and Perking, they pointed failure of the United States to join the League of Nations and the rise of the Soviet Union outside the League as one of major reasons for its failure to enforce collective security. Moreover, an example of the failure of the League of Nations' collective security was the Manchurian Crisis, when Japan occupied part of China, both of which were League members. After the invasion, members of the League passed a resolution that called for Japan to withdraw or face severe penalties. Since every nation had a veto power, Japan promptly vetoed the resolution, severely limiting the League's ability to respond. After one year of deliberation, the League passed a resolution condemning the invasion without committing its members to any action against it. The Japanese replied by quitting the League.

The Collective Policy

In December 1933, the Central Committee of the Communist Party of the Soviet Union adopted a resolution on waging a struggle for collective security, advocating the use of collective security forces to oppose the aggressive actions of fascist countries and prevent the outbreak of war. In preparation for its reply to the question of the French Government, the People's Commissariat for Foreign Affairs of the Soviet Union, based on the above-mentioned resolution of the Party Central Committee, prepared a proposal for the establishment of a system of collective security in Europe. The proposal was in effect a Soviet blueprint for the establishment of a European collective security system, containing the following four main points:

France is Germany's close neighbor and old enemy, Hitler's anti-French propaganda and breaking the treaty to expand the army also caused the French public vigilance and fear. In February 1934, the French realist politician Bardo became foreign minister, and under the promotion of other cabinet members, the foreign policy of "Grand Coalition" was formed. Bardo's foreign policy has four elements:

After two months of negotiations, Bardo formally presented the draft of the Eastern Pact to the Soviet Union and Britain in June 1934. The draft proposes the conclusion of two mutually integrated agreements: the Eastern Convention in the strict sense, namely, the Convention on mutual assistance between the Soviet Union, Germany, Poland, Czechoslovakia, Estonia, Finland, Latvia and Lithuania, and the Franco-Soviet Treaty on Mutual assistance based on the participation of the Soviet Union in the Logano Convention and the participation of France in the Eastern Convention.

In both cases, the absence of the United States deprived it of another major power that could have used economic leverage against either of the aggressor states. Inaction by the League subjected it to criticisms that it was weak and concerned more with European issues since most leading of its members were European, and it did not deter Hitler from his plans to dominate Europe. Abyssinian Emperor Haile Selassie continued to support collective security, as he assessed that impotence lay not in the principle but its covenantors' commitment to honor its tenets.

One active and articulate exponent of collective security during the immediate prewar years was Soviet Foreign Minister Maxim Litvinov.

After the Munich Agreement in September 1938, Germany, Hungary and Poland actively involved in the partition of Czechoslovakia. Nazi Germany and Poland relatively annexed Sudetenland and Cechin region in the October of 1938. In Nov. 1938, Hungary annexed south Slovakia.

Soviet foreign policy was revised, and Litvinov was replaced as foreign minister in early May 1939 to facilitate the negotiations that led to the Molotov–Ribbentrop Pact with Germany, which was signed by Litvinov's successor, Vyacheslav Molotov, on August 23. The war in Europe broke out a week later with the invasion of Poland, which started on September 1. Thus, collective security may not always work because of the lack of commitment and the unwillingness of states or the international community to act in concert (Mingst 1999).

=== United Nations ===
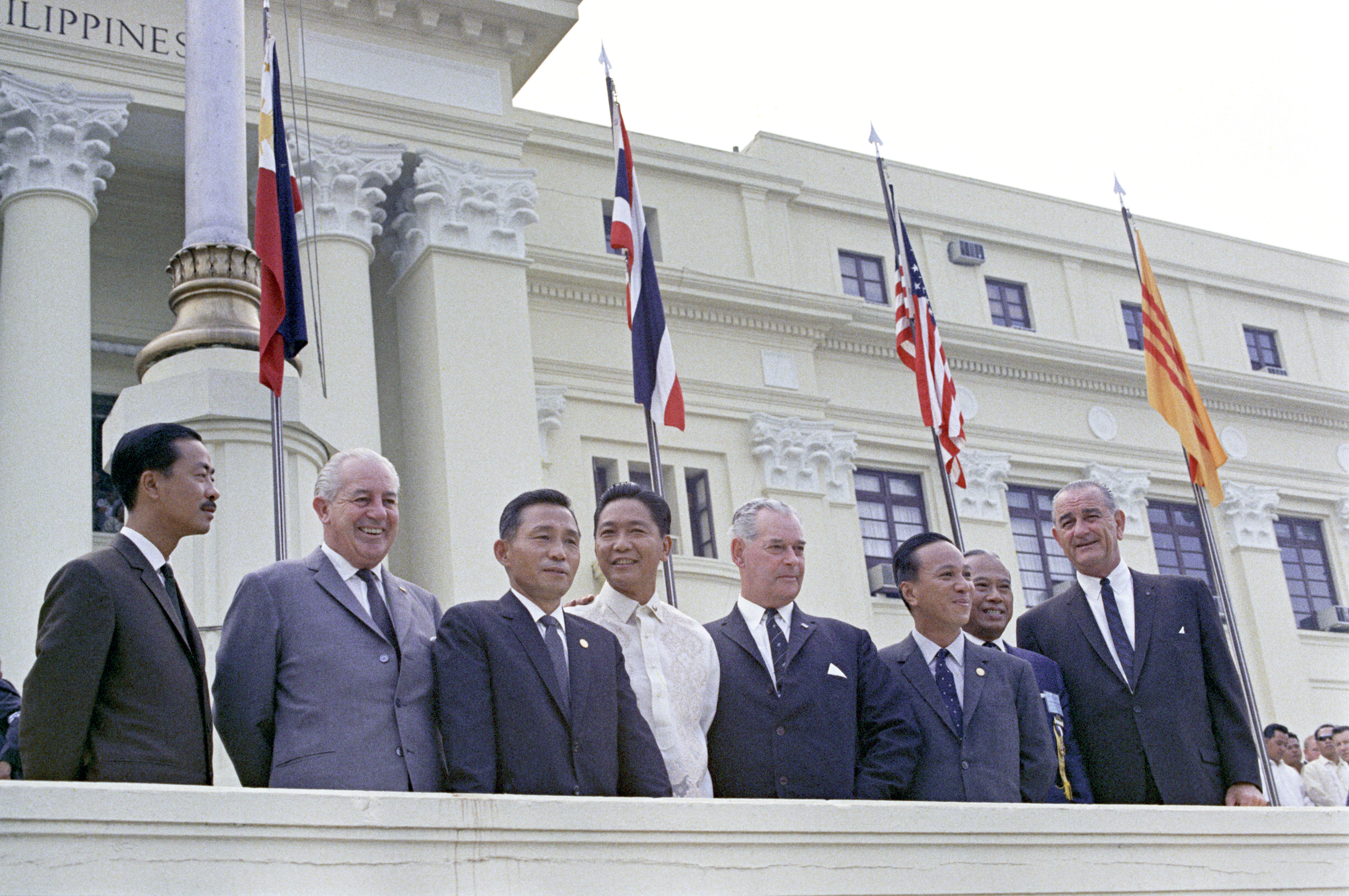
The leaders attending the Manila Summit Conference in Manila, hosted by Philippine President Ferdinand Marcos on 24 October 1966

The 1945 United Nations Charter contains stronger provisions for decision-making and collective military action than those of the League of Nations Covenant, but it represents not a complete system of collective security but a balance between collective action and the continued operation of the states system, including the continued special roles of great powers. States in the UN collective security system are selective to support or oppose UN action in certain conflicts, based on their self-interests. The UN can be somehow seen as the platform for self-interest purposes for members in Security Council because of the permanent members' veto power and the excessive assistance or aid, which have made those states to act unilaterally and to ignore the approval of or to violate resolutions of the Security Council. The Iraq crisis is a clearer example: "Rather than seek the global interest of peace and security through stability in Iraq and the Middle East region, the domination oriented members amassed their vast economic, diplomatic and military resources, captured and brazenly subjugated Iraq to an unprecedented condominial? regime serving their economic interest under Iraq Reconstruction Programme" (Eke 2007). In addition, the lack of geographical spread of members in the Security Council causes an imbalance in the role of maintenance global peace and security. The voices of small countries can be heard, but policies are not adopted in response to them unless they serve the great powers' interests.

However, collective security in the UN has not completely failed. The role of the UN and collective security in general is evolving with the rise of civil wars. Since the end of World War II, there have been 111 military conflicts worldwide, but only 9 of them have involved two or more states going to war with one another. The others have been civil wars in which other states have intervened in some manner. That means that collective security may have to evolve towards providing a means to ensure stability and a fair international resolution to those internal conflicts. Whether that involves more powerful peacekeeping forces or a larger role for the UN diplomatically is likely to be judged on a case-by-case basis.

== Collective defense ==
Member states of NATO, the best known collective defense organization

Collective defense is an arrangement, usually formalized by a treaty and an organization, among participant states that commit support in defense of a member state if it is attacked by another state outside the organization. NATO is the best-known collective defense organization; its famous Article 5 calls on (but does not fully commit) member states to assist another member under attack. This article was invoked only after the September 11 attacks on the United States, after which other NATO members provided assistance to the US war on terror by participating in the War in Afghanistan.

Collective defense has its roots in multiparty alliances and entails benefits as well as risks. On the one hand, by combining and pooling resources, it can reduce any single state's cost of providing fully for its security. For example, smaller members of NATO have leeway to invest a greater proportion of their budget on nonmilitary priorities, such as education or health, since they can count on other members to come to their defense if needed.

On the other hand, collective defense also involves risky commitments. Member states can become embroiled in costly wars benefiting neither the direct victim nor the aggressor. In World War I, France was obligated to join into war with Austria-Hungary and Germany because France's ally Russia was at war with them. Germany declared war on Russia on 1 August 1914 and on 3 August it declared war on France.

== See also ==
- List of military alliances
- World War I
- World War II
- Franco-Russian Alliance
- Triple Alliance (1882)
- Anti-Comintern Pact
- Grand Alliance (World War II)
- Franco-Soviet Treaty of Mutual Assistance
- Germany–Soviet Union relations before 1941
- Southeast Asia Treaty Organization
- Self-defence in international law
- Indivisible security

== Bibliography ==
- Beer, Francis A., ed. (1970). Alliances: Latent War Communities in the Contemporary World. New York: Holt, Rinehart, Winston.
- Bourquin, Maurice (1936). Collective Security, A record of the Seventh and Eighth International Studies Conference. Paris: International Institute.
- Claude Jr., Inis L. (2006). Collective Security as an Approach to Peace in: Classic Readings and Contemporary Debates in International Relations ed. Donald M. Goldstein, Phil Williams, & Jay M. Shafritz. Belmont CA: Thomson Wadsworth. pp. 289–302.
- Lowe, Vaughan, Adam Roberts, Jennifer Welsh and Dominik Zaum, The United Nations Security Council and War: The Evolution of Thought and Practice since 1945 Oxford: Oxford University Press, 2010, paperback, 794 pp. ISBN 978-0-19-958330-0.
- Organski, A.F.K. (1958). World Politics. Borzoi books on International Politics (1 ed.). New York: Alfred A. Knopf. pp. 461.
- Roberts, Adam and Dominik Zaum, Selective Security: War and the United Nations Security Council since 1945 (Adelphi Paper no. 395 of International Institute for Strategic Studies, London), Abingdon: Routledge, 2008, 93 pp. ISBN 978-0-415-47472-6.
- Sharp, Alan (2013). Collective Security. Leibniz Institute of European History (IEG).
- Wight, Martin (1977). Systems of States ed. Hedley Bull. London: Leicester University Press. p. 49.
