= Absolute gain =

Absolute gain may refer to:

- Gain (electronics), an increase in power or amplitude of a signal across a two-port circuit
- Antenna gain, a performance measure combining an antenna's directivity and electrical efficiency
- Absolute gain (international relations), in liberal international relations theory
