= Linda Mealey =

Evolutionary psychologist and professor

- Born: December 17, 1955; San Diego, California, US
- Died: November 5, 2002 (aged 46)
- Education: University of Texas in Austin (Ph.D., December 1984)
- Awards: 2002 College of Saint Benedict Teacher/Scholar Award
- Scientific career
- Fields: Evolutionary psychology, ethology
- Institutions: College of Saint Benedict, University of Queensland
- Thesis: The Relationship between Cultural Success and Biological Success: A Sociobiological Analysis of Marriage and Fertility Patterns in Nineteenth Century Mormon Utah (1984)

Linda Jeanne Mealey (December 17, 1955 in San Diego, California – November 5, 2002) was an American evolutionary psychologist and professor at the College of Saint Benedict.

== Biography ==
Mealey was born in San Diego, California on December 17, 1955, and grew up mainly in Cincinnati, Ohio. She received her Ph.D. from the University of Texas at Austin in December 1984. She joined the faculty of the College of Saint Benedict in 1985 as an assistant professor, and became an associate professor there in 1991. She was affiliated with the University of Queensland's School of Psychology from 1996 to 1998, and remained an adjunct professor there until her death from cancer in 2002.

== Research ==
Mealey's research into evolutionary psychology examined factors such as the attractiveness of symmetrical human faces and potential evolutionary explanations for sociopathy.

== Professional affiliations and awards ==
Mealey was a member of about 16 professional societies during her career. She served as president of the International Society for Human Ethology, and was also a counselor for the Human Behavior and Evolution Society. In 2002, she received the College of Saint Benedict's Teacher/Scholar Award, which was subsequently renamed the Linda Mealey Teacher/Scholar Award after her death.
