= Relative gain (international relations) =

Relative gain, in international relations, is the reasoning behind states taking actions to improve the balance of power and with less regard to the absolute gain (improving well-being of an individual state by itself). The balance between absolute and relative gains is one of the main divides between political realists (arguing that without centralized enforcement, inherent among sovereign states, cooperation is difficult) and liberal institutionalists (pointing to the possibility of the decentralized enforcement of cooperation).

In a hypothetical case of two states driven exclusively by relative gains, their behavior can be modeled by a zero-sum game that leaves no space for cooperation. When the desire for relative gains is not exclusive, but still dominating, the relations between two states is equivalent to the prisoner's dilemma (PD), neatly fitting the realist's view of PD being the model for the international anarchy.

In international relations, cooperation may be necessary to balance power, but concerns about relative gains will limit that cooperation due to the low quality of information about other states' behavior and interests. Such relative-gains concerns, however, may sometimes be mitigated by individual social preferences.

Relative gain is related to zero-sum game, which states that wealth cannot be expanded and the only way a state can become richer is to take wealth from another state. It differs from absolute gain, which is the total effect of a decision on the state or organization, regardless of gains made by others.

== Sources ==
- Mearsheimer, John J. (1994). "The False Promise of International Institutions" (PDF). International Security. 19 (3). The MIT Press: 5–49. ISSN 0162-2889. JSTOR 2539078. Archived from the original (PDF) on 2024-07-03.
- Snidal, Duncan (1991). "Relative Gains and the Pattern of International Cooperation". American Political Science Review. 85 (3): 701–726. doi:10.2307/1963847. JSTOR 2600947.
