= Absolute gain (international relations) =

Concept in international relations theory

According to the international relations theory of Liberalism, absolute gain is what international actors look at in determining their interests, weighing out the total effects of a decision on the state or organization and acting accordingly. The international actor's interests not only include power but also encompass the economic and cultural effects of an action as well. The theory is also interrelated with a non-zero-sum game which proposes that through use of comparative advantage, all states who engage in peaceful relations and trade can expand wealth.

This differs from Realist International Relations theories that employ relative gain, which seeks to describe the actions of states only in respect to power balances and without regard to other factors, such as economics. Relative gain is related to zero-sum game, which states that wealth cannot be expanded and the only way a state can become richer is to take wealth from another state.
