= Beauty =

Characteristic that provides pleasure or satisfaction

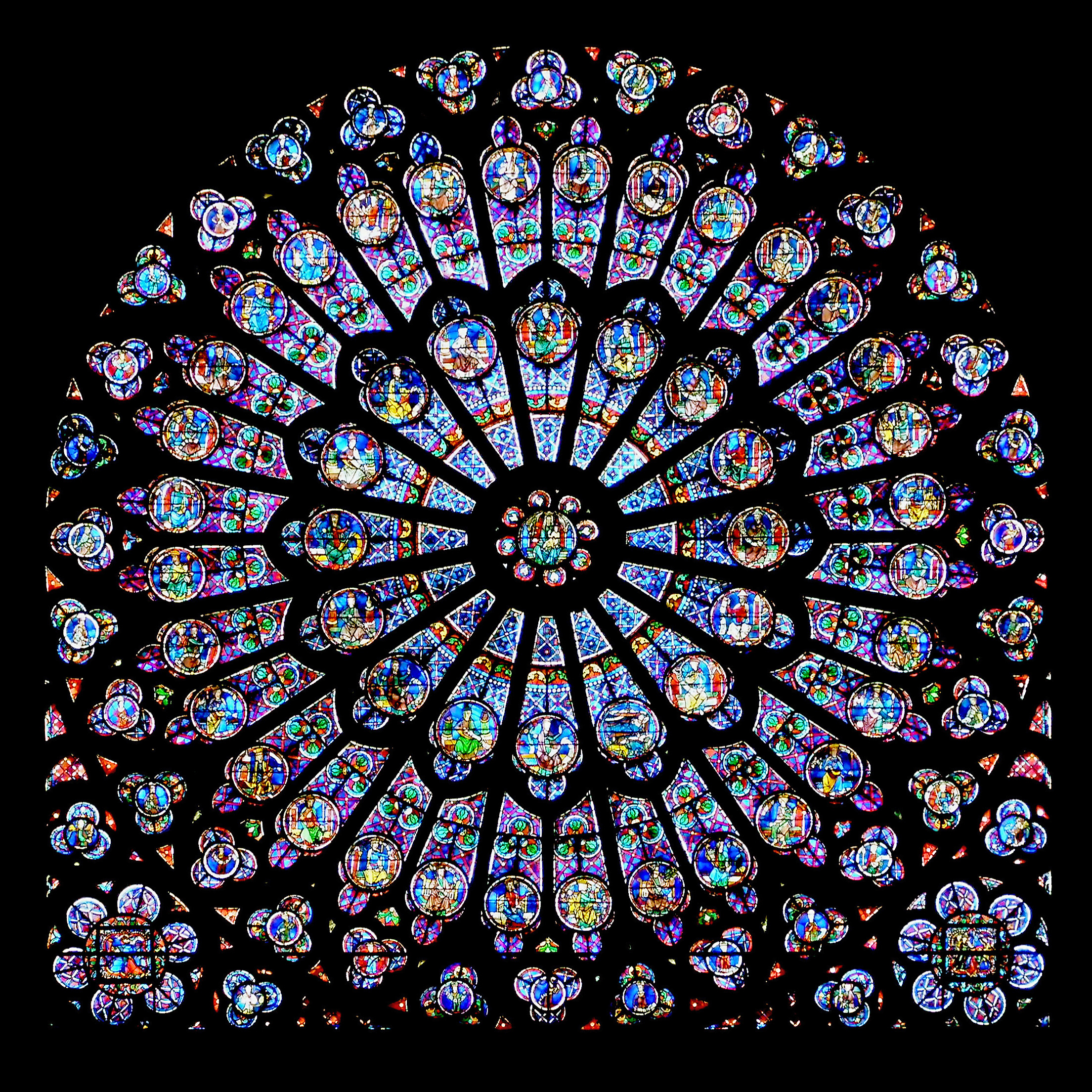
A Rayonnant style rose window in Notre-Dame de Paris. In Gothic architecture, light was considered "the source and actual essence of all that is beautiful".

Beauty is commonly described as a feature of objects that makes them pleasurable to perceive. Such objects include landscapes, sunsets, humans and works of art. Beauty, art and taste are the main subjects of aesthetics, one of the fields of study within philosophy. As a positive aesthetic value, it is contrasted with ugliness as its negative counterpart.

One difficulty in understanding beauty is that it has both objective and subjective aspects: it is seen as a property of things but also as depending on the emotional response of observers. Because of its subjective side, beauty is said to be "in the eye of the beholder". It has been argued that the ability on the side of the subject needed to perceive and judge beauty, sometimes referred to as the "sense of taste", can be trained and that the verdicts of experts coincide in the long run. This suggests the standards of validity of judgments of beauty are intersubjective, i.e. dependent on a group of judges, rather than fully subjective or objective.

Conceptions of beauty aim to capture what is essential to all beautiful things. Classical conceptions define beauty in terms of the relation between the beautiful object as a whole and its parts: the parts should stand in the right proportion to each other and thus compose an integrated harmonious whole. Hedonist conceptions see a necessary connection between pleasure and beauty, e.g. that for an object to be beautiful is for it to cause disinterested pleasure. Other conceptions include defining beautiful objects in terms of their value, of a loving attitude toward them or of their function.

== Overview ==
Beauty, together with art and taste, is the main subject of aesthetics, one of the major branches of philosophy. Beauty is usually categorized as an aesthetic property besides other properties, like grace, elegance or the sublime. As a positive aesthetic value, beauty is contrasted with ugliness as its negative counterpart. Beauty is often listed as one of the three fundamental concepts of human understanding besides truth and goodness.

Objectivists or realists see beauty as an objective or mind-independent feature of beautiful things, which is denied by subjectivists. The source of this debate is that judgments of beauty seem to be based on subjective grounds, namely our feelings, while claiming universal correctness at the same time. This tension is sometimes referred to as the "antinomy of taste". Adherents of both sides have suggested that a certain faculty, commonly called a sense of taste, is necessary for making reliable judgments about beauty. David Hume, for example, suggests that this faculty can be trained and that the verdicts of experts coincide in the long run.

Beauty is mainly discussed in relation to concrete objects accessible to sensory perception. It has been suggested that the beauty of a thing supervenes on the sensory features of this thing. It has also been proposed that abstract objects like stories or mathematical proofs can be beautiful. Beauty plays a central role in works of art and nature.

An influential distinction among beautiful things, according to Immanuel Kant, is that between adherent beauty (pulchritudo adhaerens) (Note: Pulchritudo adhaerens is translated by Zangwill as dependent beauty.) and free beauty (pulchritudo vaga). A thing has adherent beauty if its beauty depends on the conception or function of this thing, unlike free or absolute beauty. Examples of adherent beauty include an ox which is beautiful as an ox but not beautiful as a horse or a photograph which is beautiful, because it depicts a beautiful building but that lacks beauty generally speaking because of its low quality.

== Objectivism and subjectivism ==
Judgments of beauty seem to occupy an intermediary position between objective judgments, e.g. concerning the mass and shape of a grapefruit, and subjective likes, e.g. concerning whether the grapefruit tastes good. Judgments of beauty differ from the former because they are based on subjective feelings rather than objective perception. But they also differ from the latter because they lay claim on universal correctness. This tension is also reflected in common language. On the one hand, we talk about beauty as an objective feature of the world that is ascribed, for example, to landscapes, paintings or humans. The subjective side, on the other hand, is expressed in sayings like "beauty is in the eye of the beholder".

These two positions are often referred to as objectivism (or realism) and subjectivism. Objectivism is the traditional view, while subjectivism developed more recently in Western philosophy. Objectivists hold that beauty is a mind-independent feature of things. On this account, the beauty of a landscape is independent of who perceives it or whether it is perceived at all. Disagreements may be explained by an inability to perceive this feature, sometimes referred to as a "lack of taste". Subjectivism, on the other hand, denies the mind-independent existence of beauty. Influential for the development of this position was John Locke's distinction between primary qualities, which the object has independent of the observer, and secondary qualities, which constitute powers in the object to produce certain ideas in the observer. When applied to beauty, there is still a sense in which it depends on the object and its powers. But this account makes the possibility of genuine disagreements about claims of beauty implausible, since the same object may produce very different ideas in distinct observers. The notion of "taste" can still be used to explain why different people disagree about what is beautiful, but there is no objectively right or wrong taste, there are just different tastes.

The problem with both the objectivist and the subjectivist position in their extreme form is that each has to deny some intuitions about beauty. This issue is sometimes discussed under the label "antinomy of taste". It has prompted various philosophers to seek a unified theory that can take all these intuitions into account. One promising route to solve this problem is to move from subjective to intersubjective theories, which hold that the standards of validity of judgments of taste are intersubjective or dependent on a group of judges rather than objective. This approach tries to explain how genuine disagreement about beauty is possible despite the fact that beauty is a mind-dependent property, dependent not on an individual but a group. A closely related theory sees beauty as a secondary or response-dependent property. On one such account, an object is beautiful "if it causes pleasure by virtue of its aesthetic properties". The problem that different people respond differently can be addressed by combining response-dependence theories with so-called ideal-observer theories: it only matters how an ideal observer would respond. There is no general agreement on how "ideal observers" are to be defined, but it is usually assumed that they are experienced judges of beauty with a fully developed sense of taste. This suggests an indirect way of solving the antinomy of taste: instead of looking for necessary and sufficient conditions of beauty itself, one can learn to identify the qualities of good critics and rely on their judgments. This approach only works if unanimity among experts was ensured. But even experienced judges may disagree in their judgments, which threatens to undermine ideal-observer theories.

== Conceptions ==
=== Classical ===
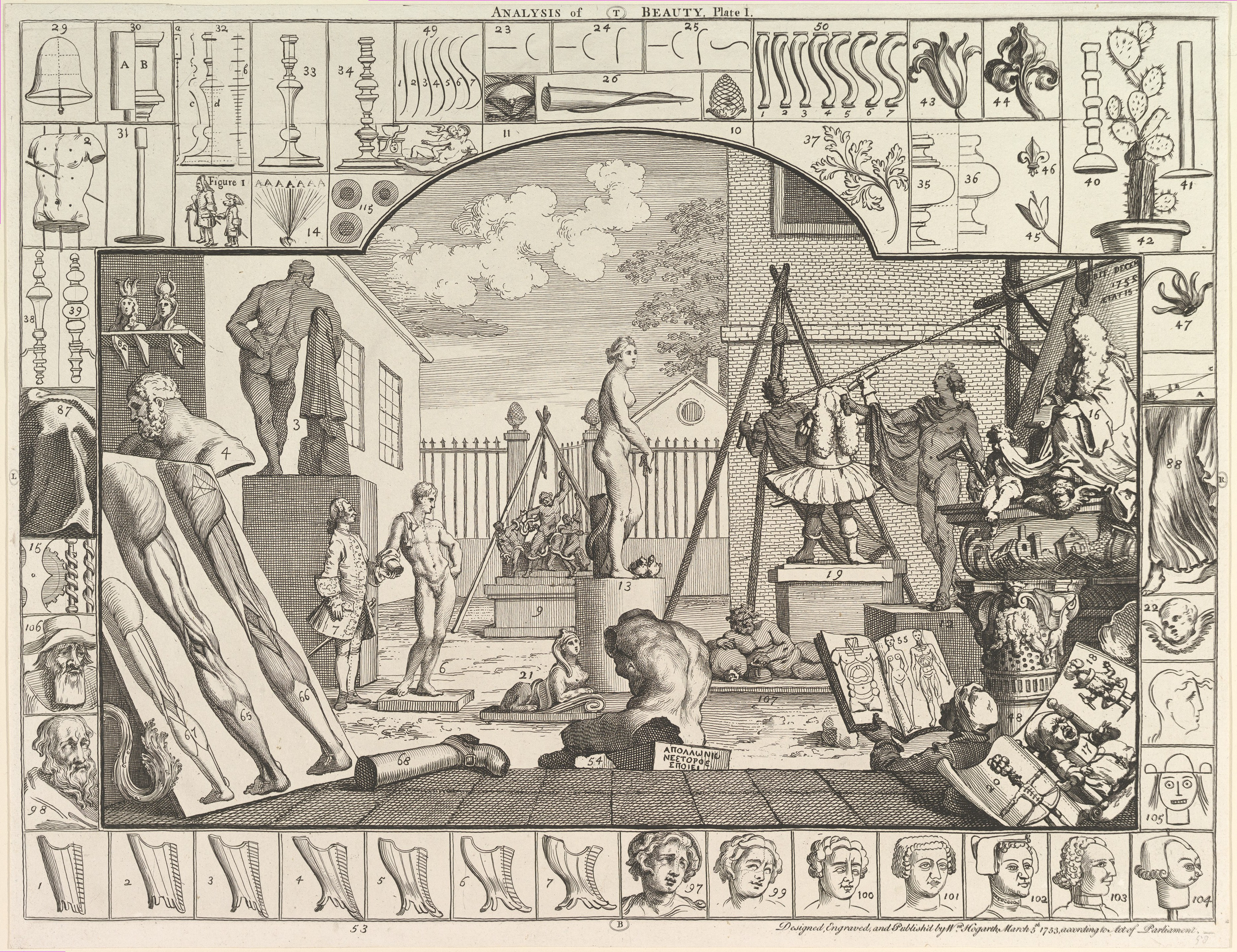
In The Analysis of Beauty, William Hogarth depicts the effect of changing proportions and attempts to define what proportions are beautiful.

The "classical conception" defines beauty in terms of the relation between the beautiful object as a whole and its parts: the parts should stand in the right proportion to each other and thus compose an integrated harmonious whole. On this account, which found its most explicit articulation in the Italian Renaissance, the beauty of a human body, for example, depends, among other things, on the right proportion of the different parts of the body and on the overall symmetry. One problem with this conception is that it is difficult to give a general and detailed description of what is meant by "harmony between parts" and raises the suspicion that defining beauty through harmony results in exchanging one unclear term for another one. Some attempts have been made to dissolve this suspicion by searching for laws of beauty, like the golden ratio.

18th century philosopher Alexander Baumgarten, for example, saw laws of beauty in analogy with laws of nature and believed that they could be discovered through empirical research. As of 2003, these attempts have failed to find a general definition of beauty and several authors take the opposite claim that such laws cannot be formulated, as part of their definition of beauty.

=== Hedonism ===
A very common element in many conceptions of beauty is its relation to pleasure. Hedonism makes this relation part of the definition of beauty by holding that there is a necessary connection between pleasure and beauty, e.g. that for an object to be beautiful is for it to cause pleasure or that the experience of beauty is always accompanied by pleasure. This account is sometimes labeled as "aesthetic hedonism" in order to distinguish it from other forms of hedonism. An influential articulation of this position comes from Thomas Aquinas, who treats beauty as "that which pleases in the very apprehension of it". Immanuel Kant explains this pleasure through a harmonious interplay between the faculties of understanding and imagination. A further question for hedonists is how to explain the relation between beauty and pleasure. This problem is akin to the Euthyphro dilemma: is something beautiful because we enjoy it or do we enjoy it because it is beautiful? Identity theorists solve this problem by denying that there is a difference between beauty and pleasure: they identify beauty, or the appearance of it, with the experience of aesthetic pleasure.

Hedonists usually restrict and specify the notion of pleasure in various ways in order to avoid obvious counterexamples. One important distinction in this context is the difference between pure and mixed pleasure. Pure pleasure excludes any form of pain or unpleasant feeling while the experience of mixed pleasure can include unpleasant elements. But beauty can involve mixed pleasure, for example, in the case of a beautifully tragic story, which is why mixed pleasure is usually allowed in hedonist conceptions of beauty.

Another problem faced by hedonist theories is that we take pleasure from many things that are not beautiful. One way to address this issue is to associate beauty with a special type of pleasure: aesthetic or disinterested pleasure. A pleasure is disinterested if it is indifferent to the existence of the beautiful object or if it did not arise owing to an antecedent desire through means-end reasoning. For example, the joy of looking at a beautiful landscape would still be valuable if it turned out that this experience was an illusion, which would not be true if this joy was due to seeing the landscape as a valuable real estate opportunity. Opponents of hedonism usually concede that many experiences of beauty are pleasurable but deny that this is true for all cases. For example, a cold jaded critic may still be a good judge of beauty because of her years of experience but lack the joy that initially accompanied her work. One way to avoid this objection is to allow responses to beautiful things to lack pleasure while insisting that all beautiful things merit pleasure, that aesthetic pleasure is the only appropriate response to them.

=== Others ===
G. E. Moore explained beauty in regard to intrinsic value as "that of which the admiring contemplation is good in itself". This definition connects beauty to experience while managing to avoid some of the problems usually associated with subjectivist positions since it allows that things may be beautiful even if they are never experienced.

Another subjectivist theory of beauty comes from George Santayana, who suggested that we project pleasure onto the things we call "beautiful". So in a process akin to a category mistake, one treats one's subjective pleasure as an objective property of the beautiful thing. Other conceptions include defining beauty in terms of a loving or longing attitude toward the beautiful object or in terms of its usefulness or function. In 1871, functionalist Charles Darwin explained beauty as result of accumulative sexual selection in "The Descent of Man and Selection in Relation to Sex".

== In philosophy ==
=== Greco-Roman tradition ===
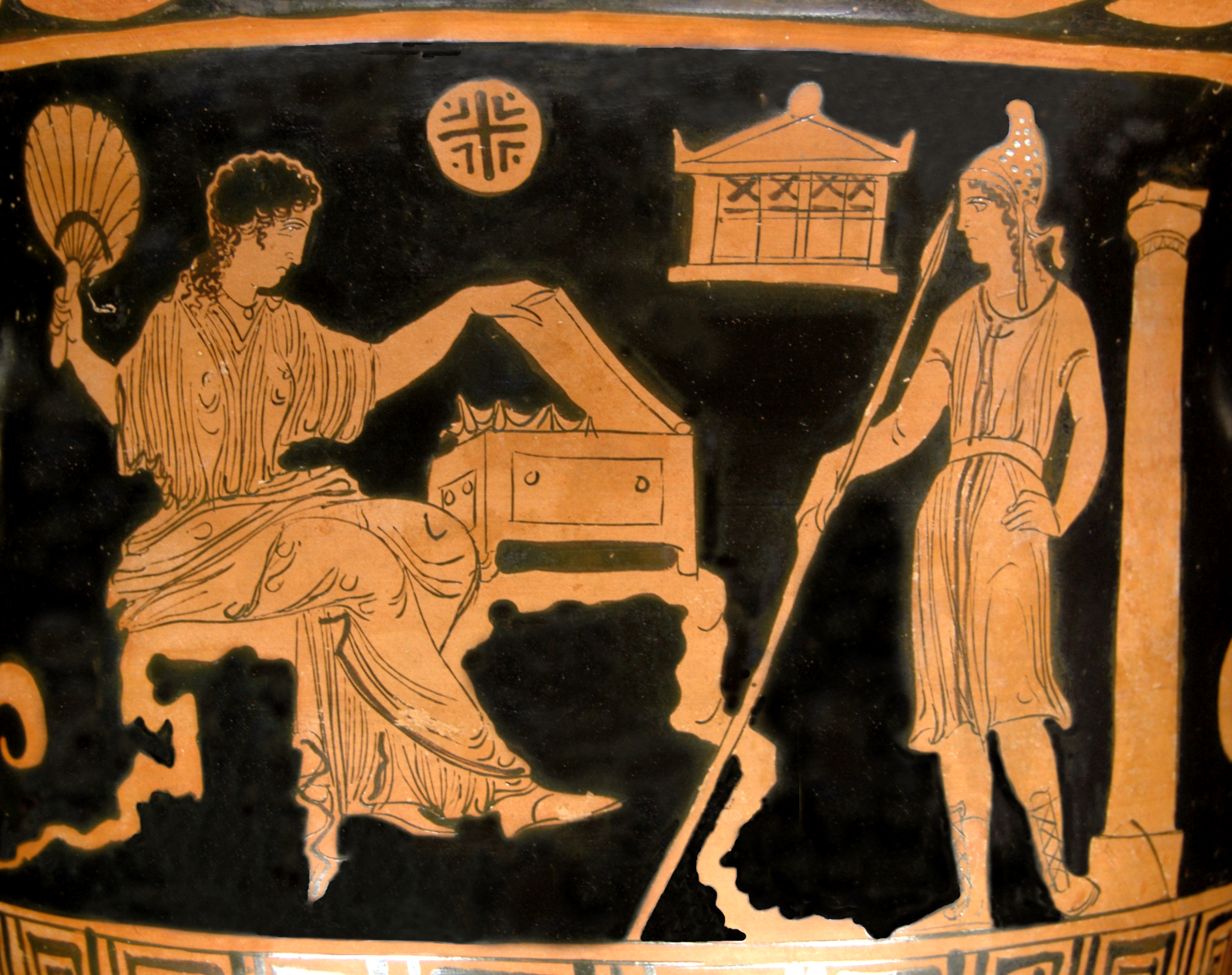
Greek mythology mentions Helen of Troy (left) as the most beautiful woman.

The classical Greek noun that best translates to the English-language words "beauty" or "beautiful" was κάλλος, kallos, and the adjective was καλός, kalos. This is also translated as "good" or "of fine quality" and thus has a broader meaning than mere physical or material beauty. Similarly, kallos was used differently from the English word beauty in that it first and foremost applied to humans and bore an erotic connotation. The Koine Greek word for beautiful was ὡραῖος, hōraios, an adjective etymologically coming from the word ὥρα, hōra, meaning "hour". In Koine Greek, beauty was thus associated with "being of one's hour". Thus, a ripe fruit (of its time) was considered beautiful, whereas a young woman trying to appear older or an older woman trying to appear younger would not be considered beautiful. In Attic Greek, hōraios had many meanings, including "youthful" and "ripe old age". Another classical term in use to describe beauty was pulchrum (Latin).

Beauty for ancient thinkers existed both in form, which is the material world as it is, and as embodied in the spirit, which is the world of mental formations. Greek mythology mentions Helen of Troy as the most beautiful woman. Ancient Greek architecture is based on this view of symmetry and proportion.

==== Pre-Socratic ====
In one fragment of Heraclitus's writings (Fragment 106) he mentions beauty, this reads: "To God all things are beautiful, good, right..." The earliest Western theory of beauty can be found in the works of early Greek philosophers from the pre-Socratic period, such as Pythagoras, who conceived of beauty as useful for a moral education of the soul. He wrote of how people experience pleasure when aware of a certain type of formal situation present in reality, perceivable by sight or through the ear and discovered the underlying mathematical ratios in the harmonic scales in music. The Pythagoreans conceived of the presence of beauty in universal terms, which is, as existing in a cosmological state, they observed beauty in the heavens. They saw a strong connection between mathematics and beauty. In particular, they noted that objects proportioned according to the golden ratio seemed more attractive.

==== Classical period ====
The classical concept of beauty is one that exhibits perfect proportion (Wolfflin). In this context, the concept belonged often within the discipline of mathematics. An idea of spiritual beauty emerged during the classical period, beauty was something embodying divine goodness, while the demonstration of behaviour which might be classified as beautiful, from an inner state of morality which is aligned to the good.

The writing of Xenophon shows a conversation between Socrates and Aristippus. Socrates discerned differences in the conception of the beautiful, for example, in inanimate objects, the effectiveness of execution of design was a deciding factor on the perception of beauty in something. By the account of Xenophon, Socrates found beauty congruent with that to which was defined as the morally good, in short, he thought beauty coincident with the good.

Beauty is a subject of Plato in his work Symposium. In the work, the high priestess Diotima describes how beauty moves out from a core singular appreciation of the body to outer appreciations via loved ones, to the world in its state of culture and society (Wright). In other words, Diotoma gives to Socrates an explanation of how love should begin with erotic attachment, and end with the transcending of the physical to an appreciation of beauty as a thing in itself. The ascent of love begins with one's own body, then secondarily, in appreciating beauty in another's body, thirdly beauty in the soul, which cognates to beauty in the mind in the modern sense, fourthly beauty in institutions, laws and activities, fifthly beauty in knowledge, the sciences, and finally to lastly love beauty itself, which translates to the original Greek language term as auto to kalon. In the final state, auto to kalon and truth are united as one. There is the sense in the text, concerning love and beauty they both co-exist but are still independent or, in other words, mutually exclusive, since love does not have beauty since it seeks beauty. The work toward the end provides a description of beauty in a negative sense.

Plato also discusses beauty in his work Phaedrus, and identifies Alcibiades as beautiful in Parmenides. He considered beauty to be the Idea (Form) above all other Ideas. Platonic thought synthesized beauty with the divine. Scruton (cited: Konstan) states Plato states of the idea of beauty, of it (the idea), being something inviting desirousness (cf. seducing), and, promotes an intellectual renunciation (cf. denouncing) of desire. For Alexander Nehamas, it is only the locating of desire to which the sense of beauty exists, in the considerations of Plato.

Aristotle defines beauty in Metaphysics as having order, symmetry and definiteness which the mathematical sciences exhibit to a special degree. He saw a relationship between the beautiful (to kalon) and virtue, arguing that "Virtue aims at the beautiful."

==== Roman ====
In De Natura Deorum, Cicero wrote: "the splendour and beauty of creation", in respect to this, and all the facets of reality resulting from creation, he postulated these to be a reason to see the existence of a God as creator.

=== Western Middle Ages ===
In the Middle Ages, Catholic philosophers like Thomas Aquinas included beauty among the transcendental attributes of being. In his Summa Theologica, Aquinas described the three conditions of beauty as: integritas (wholeness), consonantia (harmony and proportion), and claritas (a radiance and clarity that makes the form of a thing apparent to the mind).

In the Gothic Architecture of the High and Late Middle Ages, light was considered the most beautiful revelation of God, which was heralded in design. Examples are the stained glass of Gothic Cathedrals including Notre-Dame de Paris and Chartres Cathedral.

St. Augustine said of beauty "Beauty is indeed a good gift of God; but that the good may not think it a great good, God dispenses it even to the wicked."

=== Renaissance ===
Classical philosophy and sculptures of men and women produced according to the Greek philosophers' tenets of ideal human beauty were rediscovered in Renaissance Europe, leading to a re-adoption of what became known as a "classical ideal". In terms of female human beauty, a woman whose appearance conforms to these tenets is still called a "classical beauty" or said to possess a "classical beauty", whilst the foundations laid by Greek and Roman artists have also supplied the standard for male beauty and female beauty in Western civilization as seen, for example, in the Winged Victory of Samothrace. During the Gothic era, the classical aesthetical canon of beauty was rejected as sinful. Later, Renaissance and humanist thinkers rejected this view, and considered beauty to be the product of rational order and harmonious proportions. Renaissance artists and architects (such as Giorgio Vasari in his "Lives of Artists") criticised the Gothic period as irrational and barbarian. This point of view of Gothic art lasted until Romanticism, in the 19th century. Vasari aligned himself to the classical notion and thought of beauty as defined as arising from proportion and order.

=== Age of Reason ===
The Birth of Venus (c. 1485) by Sandro Botticelli. The goddess Venus (Aphrodite) is the classical personification of beauty.

The Age of Reason saw a rise in an interest in beauty as a philosophical subject. For example, Scottish philosopher Francis Hutcheson argued that beauty is "unity in variety and variety in unity". He wrote that beauty was neither purely subjective nor purely objective—it could be understood not as "any Quality suppos'd to be in the Object, which should of itself be beautiful, without relation to any Mind which perceives it: For Beauty, like other Names of sensible Ideas, properly denotes the Perception of some mind; ... however we generally imagine that there is something in the Object just like our Perception."

Immanuel Kant believed that there could be no "universal criterion of the beautiful" and that the experience of beauty is subjective, but that an object is judged to be beautiful when it seems to display "purposiveness"; that is, when its form is perceived to have the character of a thing designed according to some principle and fitted for a purpose. He distinguished "free beauty" from "merely adherent beauty", explaining that "the first presupposes no concept of what the object ought to be; the second does presuppose such a concept and the perfection of the object in accordance therewith." By this definition, free beauty is found in seashells and wordless music; adherent beauty in buildings and the human body.

The Romantic poets, too, became highly concerned with the nature of beauty, with John Keats arguing in Ode on a Grecian Urn that:

Beauty is truth, truth beauty, —that is all
Ye know on earth, and all ye need to know.

=== Western 19th and 20th century ===
In the Romantic period, Edmund Burke postulated a difference between beauty in its classical meaning and the sublime. The concept of the sublime, as explicated by Burke and Kant, suggested viewing Gothic art and architecture, though not in accordance with the classical standard of beauty, as sublime.

The 20th century saw an increasing rejection of beauty by artists and philosophers alike, culminating in postmodernism's anti-aesthetics. This is despite beauty being a central concern of one of postmodernism's main influences, Friedrich Nietzsche, who argued that the Will to Power was the Will to Beauty.

In the aftermath of postmodernism's rejection of beauty, thinkers have returned to beauty as an important value. American analytic philosopher Guy Sircello proposed his New Theory of Beauty as an effort to reaffirm the status of beauty as an important philosophical concept. He rejected the subjectivism of Kant and sought to identify the properties inherent in an object that make it beautiful. He called qualities such as vividness, boldness, and subtlety "properties of qualitative degree" (PQDs) and stated that a PQD makes an object beautiful if it is not—and does not create the appearance of—"a property of deficiency, lack, or defect"; and if the PQD is strongly present in the object.

Elaine Scarry argues that beauty is related to justice.

Beauty is also studied by psychologists and neuroscientists in the field of experimental aesthetics and neuroesthetics respectively. Psychological theories see beauty as a form of pleasure. Correlational findings support the view that more beautiful objects are also more pleasing. Some studies suggest that higher experienced beauty is associated with activity in the medial orbitofrontal cortex. This approach of localizing the processing of beauty in one brain region has received criticism within the field.

Philosopher and novelist Umberto Eco wrote On Beauty: A History of a Western Idea (2004) and On Ugliness (2007). The narrator of his novel The Name of the Rose follows Aquinas in declaring: "three things concur in creating beauty: first of all integrity or perfection, and for this reason, we consider ugly all incomplete things; then proper proportion or consonance; and finally clarity and light", before going on to say "the sight of the beautiful implies peace". Mike Phillips has described Umberto Eco's On Beauty as "incoherent" and criticized him for focusing only on Western European history and devoting none of his book to Eastern European, Asian, or African history. Amy Finnerty described Eco's work On Ugliness favorably.

=== Chinese philosophy ===
Chinese philosophy has traditionally not made a separate discipline of the philosophy of beauty. Confucius identified beauty with goodness, and considered a virtuous personality to be the greatest of beauties: In his philosophy, "a neighborhood with a ren man in it is a beautiful neighborhood." Confucius's student Zeng Shen expressed a similar idea: "few men could see the beauty in some one whom they dislike." Mencius considered "complete truthfulness" to be beauty. Zhu Xi said: "When one has strenuously implemented goodness until it is filled to completion and has accumulated truth, then the beauty will reside within it and will not depend on externals."

== Human attributes ==
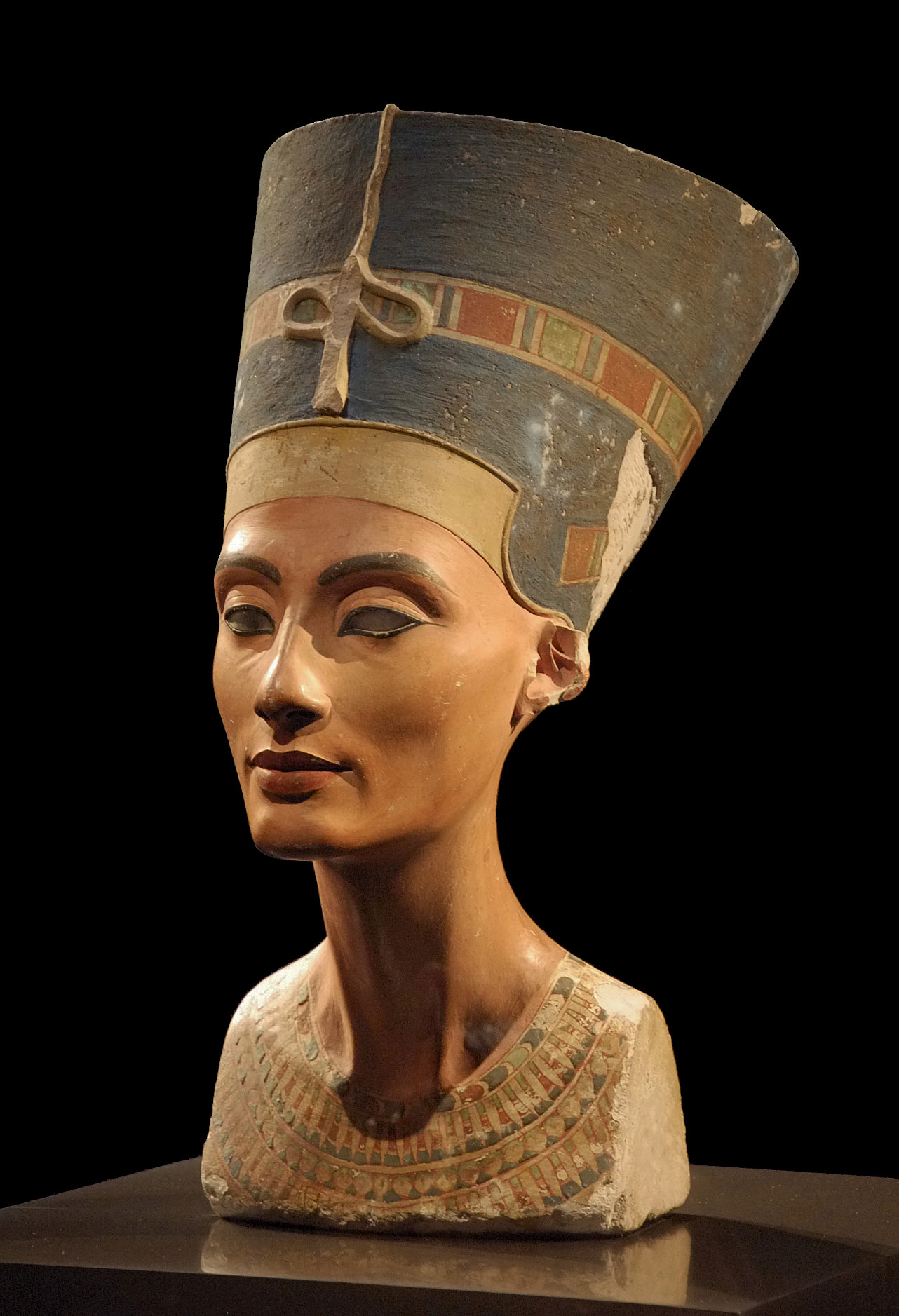
The bust of Nefertiti, 14th century BC

The word "beauty" is often used as a countable noun to describe a beautiful woman.

The characterization of a person as "beautiful", whether on an individual basis or by community consensus, is often based on some combination of inner beauty, which includes psychological factors such as personality, intelligence, grace, politeness, charisma, integrity, congruence and elegance, and outer beauty (i.e. physical attractiveness) which includes physical attributes which are valued on an aesthetic basis.

Standards of beauty have changed over time, based on changing cultural values. Historically, paintings show a wide range of different standards for beauty.

A strong indicator of physical beauty is "averageness". When images of human faces are averaged together to form a composite image, they become progressively closer to the "ideal" image and are perceived as more attractive. This was first noticed in 1883, when Francis Galton overlaid photographic composite images of the faces of vegetarians and criminals to see if there was a typical facial appearance for each. When doing this, he noticed that the composite images were more attractive as compared to any of the individual images. Researchers have replicated the result under more controlled conditions and found that the computer-generated, mathematical average of a series of faces is rated more favorably than individual faces. It is argued that it is evolutionarily advantageous that sexual creatures are attracted to mates who possess predominantly common or average features, because it suggests the absence of genetic or acquired defects.

Since the 1970s there has been increasing evidence that a preference for beautiful faces emerges early in infancy, and is probably innate, and that the rules by which attractiveness is established are similar across different genders and cultures.

A feature of beautiful women which has been explored by researchers is a waist–hip ratio of approximately 0.70. As of 2004, physiologists had shown that women with hourglass figures were more fertile than other women because of higher levels of certain female hormones, a fact that may subconsciously condition males choosing mates. In 2008, other commentators have suggested that this preference may not be universal. For instance, in some non-Western cultures in which women have to do work such as finding food, men tend to have preferences for higher waist-hip ratios.

Exposure to the thin ideal in mass media, such as fashion magazines, directly correlates with body dissatisfaction, low self-esteem, and the development of eating disorders among female viewers. Further, the widening gap between individual body sizes and societal ideals continues to breed anxiety among young girls as they grow, highlighting the dangerous nature of beauty standards in society.

=== Western concept ===
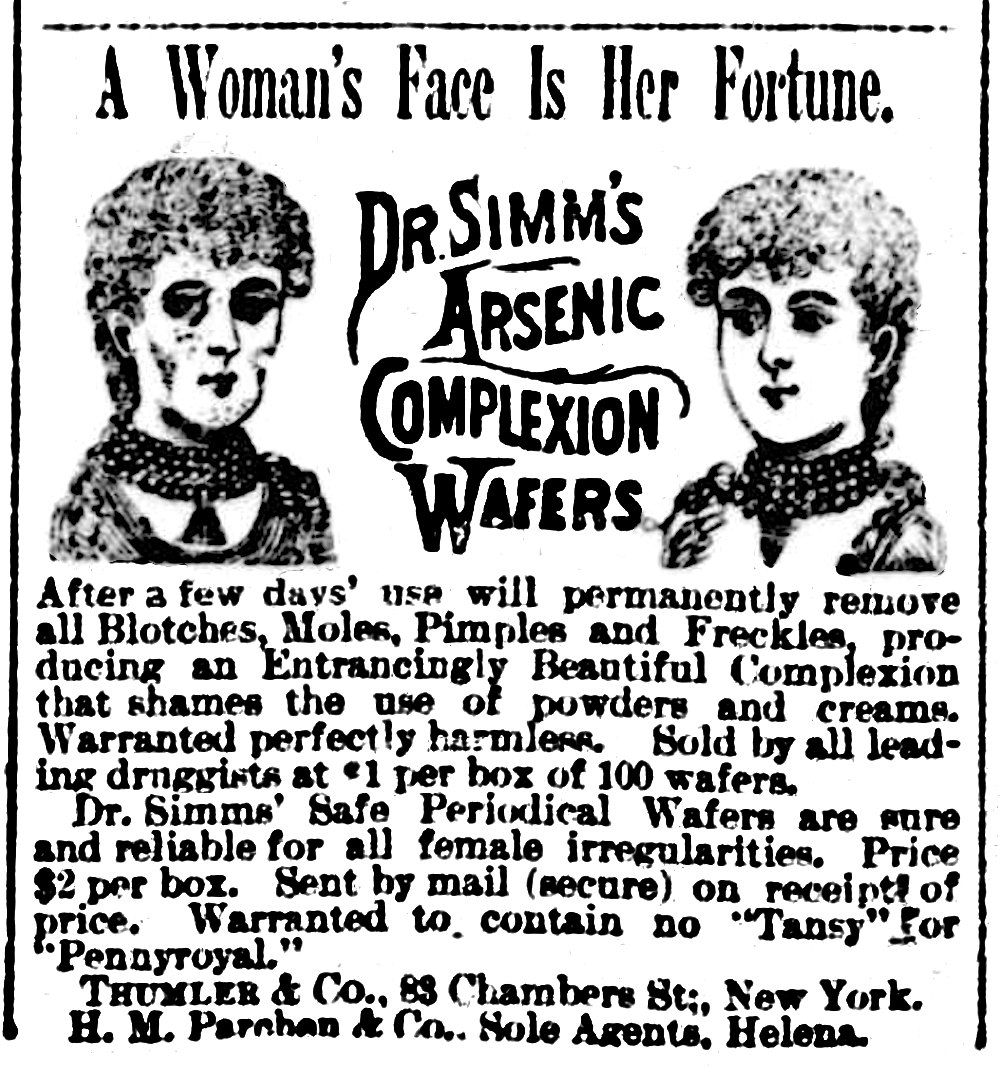
An 1889 U.S. newspaper ad for "arsenic complexion wafers" decried blotches, moles, pimples, freckles, and "all female irregularities". Arsenic was known to be poisonous during the Victorian era.

A study using Chinese immigrants and Hispanic, Black and White American citizens found that their ideals of female beauty were not significantly different. Participants in the study rated Asian and Latina women as more attractive than White and Black women, and it was found that Asian and Latina women had more of the attributes that were considered attractive for women. Exposure to Western media did not influence or improve the Asian men's ratings of White women.

One study found that East Asian women in the United States are closer to the ideal figure promoted in Western media, and that East Asian women conform to both Western and Eastern influences in the United States. East Asian men were found to be more impacted by Western beauty ideals than East Asian women, in the United States. East Asian men felt as though their bodies were not large enough and therefore deviated from the Western norm. East Asian men and white Western women were found to have the highest levels of body dissatisfaction in the United States. A study of African American and South Asian women found that some had internalized a white beauty ideal that placed light skin and straight hair at the top.

Eurocentric standards for men include tallness, leanness, and muscularity, which have been idolized through American media, such as in Hollywood films and magazine covers.

In the United States, African Americans have historically been subjected to beauty ideals that often do not reflect their own appearance, which can lead to issues of low self-esteem. African-American philosopher Cornel West elaborates that, "much of black self-hatred and self-contempt has to do with the refusal of many black Americans to love their own black bodies-especially their black noses, hips, lips, and hair." According to Patton (2006), the stereotype of African-American women's inferiority (relative to other races of women) maintains a system of oppression based on race and gender that operates to the detriment of women of all races, and also black men. In the 1960s, the black is beautiful cultural movement sought to dispel the notion of a Eurocentric concept of beauty.

Much criticism has been directed at models of beauty which depend solely upon Western ideals of beauty, as seen, for example, in the Barbie franchise. Criticisms of Barbie are often centered around concerns that children consider Barbie a role model of beauty and will attempt to emulate her. One of the most common criticisms of Barbie is that she promotes an unrealistic idea of body image for a young woman, leading to a risk that girls who attempt to emulate her will become anorexic.

As of 1998, these criticisms of the lack of diversity in such franchises as the Barbie model of beauty in Western culture, had led to a dialogue to create non-exclusive models of Western ideals in body type for young girls who do not match the thinness ideal that Barbie represents. Mattel responded to these criticisms.

In East Asian cultures, familial pressures and cultural norms shape beauty ideals. A 2017 experimental study concluded that Asian cultural idealization of "fragile" girls was impacting Asian American women's lifestyle, eating, and appearance choices.

== Effects on society ==
Researchers have found that good-looking students get higher grades from their teachers than students with an ordinary appearance. Some studies using mock criminal trials have shown that physically attractive "defendants" are less likely to be convicted—and if convicted are likely to receive lighter sentences—than less attractive ones (although the opposite effect was observed when the alleged crime was swindling, perhaps because jurors perceived the defendant's attractiveness as facilitating the crime). Studies among teens and young adults, such as those of psychiatrist and self-help author Eva Ritvo show that skin conditions have a profound effect on social behavior and opportunity.

How much money a person earns may also be influenced by physical beauty. One study found that people low in physical attractiveness earn 5 to 10 percent less than ordinary-looking people, who in turn earn 3 to 8 percent less than those who are considered good-looking. In the market for loans, the least attractive people are less likely to get approvals, although they are less likely to default. In the marriage market, women's looks are at a premium, but men's looks do not matter much. The impact of physical attractiveness on earnings varies across races, with the largest beauty wage gap among black women and black men.

Conversely, being very unattractive increases the individual's propensity for criminal activity for a number of crimes ranging from burglary to theft to selling illicit drugs.

Discrimination against others based on their appearance is known as lookism.

== See also ==
- Adornment
- Aesthetics
- Beauty pageant
- Body modification
- Feminine beauty ideal
- Glamour (presentation)
- Masculine beauty ideal
- Mathematical beauty
- Processing fluency theory of aesthetic pleasure
- Unattractiveness
- Cosmetics
