= Averageness =

Perceived beauty of an 'averaged' face

In physical attractiveness studies, averageness describes the physical beauty that results from averaging the facial features of people of the same gender and approximately the same age. The majority of averageness studies have focused on photographic overlay studies of human faces, in which images are morphed together. The term "average" is used strictly to denote the technical definition of the mathematical mean. An averaged face is not unremarkable, but is, in fact, quite good looking. Nor is it typical in the sense of common or frequently occurring in the population, though it appears familiar, and is typical in the sense that it is a good example of a face that is representative of the category of faces.

A possible evolutionary explanation for averageness is koinophilia, in which sexually-reproducing animals seek mates with primarily average features, because extreme and uncommon features are likely to indicate disadvantageous mutations.

== History ==
The effect was first described in 1878 by Francis Galton. He had devised a technique called composite photography, which he believed could be used to identify 'types' by appearance, which he hoped would aid medical diagnosis, and even criminology through the identification of typical criminal faces. Galton's hypothesis was that certain groups of people may have common facial characteristics. To test the hypothesis, he created photographic composite images of the faces of vegetarians and criminals to see if there was a typical facial appearance for each. Galton overlaid multiple images of faces onto a single photographic plate so that each individual face contributed roughly equally to a final composite face. The resultant "averaged" faces did little to allow the a priori identification of either criminals or vegetarians, failing Galton's hypothesis. However, unexpectedly Galton observed that the composite image was more attractive than the component faces. Galton published this finding in 1878, and also described his composite photography technique in detail in Inquiries in Human Faculty and its Development.

Similar observations were made in 1886 by Stoddard, who created composite faces of members of the National Academy of Sciences and graduating seniors of Smith College.

This phenomenon is now known as "averageness-effect", that is, high physical attractiveness tends to be indicative of the average traits of the population.

Despite the novelty of these findings, Galton and Stoddard's observations were forgotten for over a century.

== Research ==
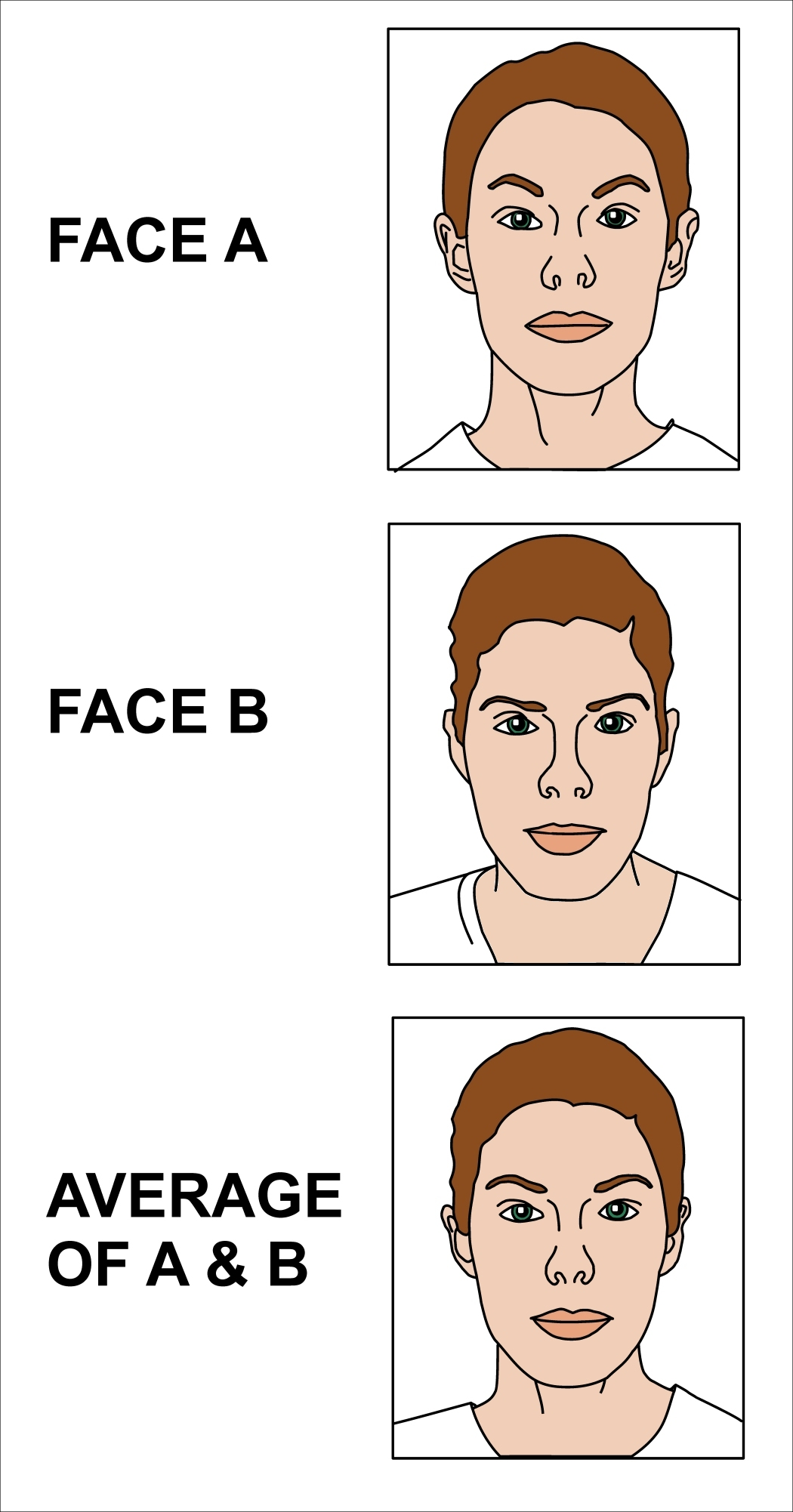
Outline drawings of two young women's faces, and an averaged image of the two

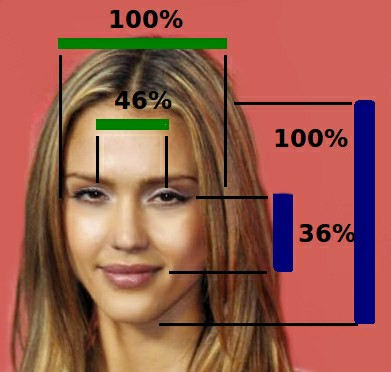
A University of Toronto study found that the facial proportions of celebrities including Jessica Alba were close to the average of all female profiles.

In 1990, one of the first computer-based photographic attractiveness rating studies was conducted. During this year psychologists Langlois and Roggman wanted to systematically examine whether mathematical averageness is linked with facial attractiveness. To test this, they selected photographs of 192 young male and female white faces; each of which was computer scanned and digitized. They then made computer-processed composites of each image, as 2-, 4-, 8-, 16-, and 32-face composites, averaged by pixel. These faces, as well as the component faces, were rated for attractiveness by 300 judges on a 5-point Likert scale (1 = very unattractive, 5 = very attractive). The 32-composite face was the most visually attractive of all the faces.

Many studies, using different averaging techniques, including the use of line drawings and face profiles, have shown that this is a general principle: average faces are consistently more attractive than the faces used to generate them. Furthermore, if a female composite (averaged) face made of 32 different faces is overlain with the face of an extremely attractive female model, the two images often line up closely, indicating that the model's facial configuration is very similar to the composite's. See, for example, the illustration of Jessica Alba on the right.

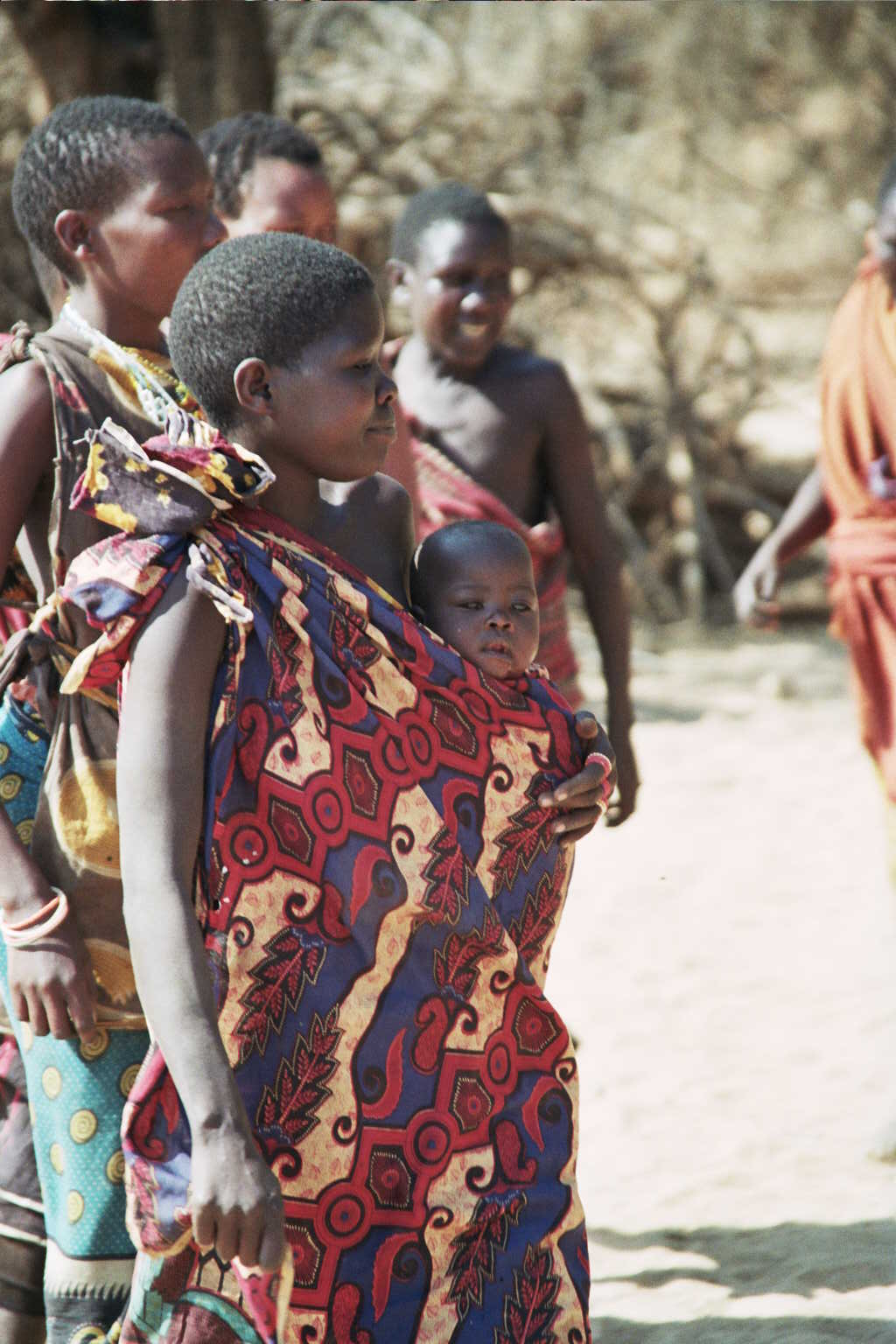
Transcending culture: Hadza people rated averaged Hadza faces as more attractive than single faces from the tribe.

This principle transcends culture. For instance, Coren Apicella and her co-workers from Harvard University created average faces of an isolated hunter-gatherer tribe of 1,000 in Tanzania, Africa, the Hadza people. Hadza people rated the averaged Hadza faces as more attractive than the actual faces in the tribe. While Europeans also rated average Hadza faces as attractive, the Hadza people expressed no preference for average European faces. Apicella attributes this difference to the wider visual experiences of the Europeans, as they had been exposed to both Western and African faces. Thus the indifference of the Hadza towards average European faces could have been the result of lacking the European norm in their visual experience. These results suggest that the rules for extracting attractive faces are culture-independent and innate, but the results of applying the rules depend on the environment and cultural experience.

That the preference for the average is biological rather than cultural has been supported by studies on babies, who gaze longer at attractive faces than at unattractive ones. Furthermore, Mark Stauss reported that 10-month-old children respond to average faces in the same way as they respond to attractive faces, and that these infants can extract the average from simply drawn faces consisting of only 4 features. Adam Rubenstein and coworkers showed that already at six months of age, children not only treat average faces the same as they treat attractive faces, but they are also able to extract the central tendency (i.e. the average) from a set of complex, naturalistic faces presented to them (i.e. not just the very simple 4-features faces used by Strauss). Thus the ability to extract the average from a set of realistic facial images operates from an early age, and is therefore almost certainly instinctive.

Despite these findings, David Perrett and his colleagues found that both men and women considered that a face averaged from a set of attractive faces was more appealing than one averaged from a wide range of women's faces, aged 20–30 years. When the differences between the first face and the second face were slightly exaggerated the new "exaggerated" (or "caricaturized") face was judged, on average, to be more attractive still. Although the three faces look very similar, the so-called "exaggerated face" looks younger: a slimmer (less wide) face, and larger eyes, than the average face. It also had a narrower lower jaw and smaller nose-to-mouth, and nose-to-chin distances than the average face. Since the same results were obtained using Japanese subjects and viewers, these findings are probably culture-independent, indicating that people generally find youthful average faces sexually the most attractive.

== Explanations ==
The explanation for the averageness phenomenon covers two distinct, but complementary fields of inquiry: cognitive and developmental psychology, and evolutionary biology.

Darwin's (1859) theory of natural selection states that advantageous characteristics replace their less advantageous counterparts, to become the dominant characteristics of the population. Mate-seeking individuals would therefore be expected to preferentially choose individuals with a minimum of unusual features, or, stated differently, individuals whose characteristics are all close to the mean of the population. These individuals are the least likely to carry harmful mutations. This form of mate choice is known as koinophilia, which explains why, what humans determine to be a beautiful face, is a face that contains no extreme features.

Adults and infants organize and consolidate sensory information into categories (e.g. "trees", "chairs", "dogs", "automobiles", "clouds" etc.). Cognitive averaging of the individual exemplars within a category creates a "prototype", or central representative of the category. Thus after seeing several exemplars from a category both adults and infants respond to an averaged representation of those exemplars as if it were familiar. That is, they show evidence of forming mental prototypes, on which they then rely to recognize new instances of the category.

In addition, prototypes are also often preferred to individual exemplars of the stimuli categories. Thus an average face is probably attractive simply because it is prototypical.

If prototypes and cognitive averaging are used by infants and adults to organize and consolidate incoming information people may form a common prototype of faces representing the central tendency of the population very early in life. Fifteen minute-old neonates show no preference for attractive faces over unattractive faces. But 72 hours later they already stare longer at faces judged by adults to be attractive than they do at unattractive faces. This rapid development of an appreciation of facial beauty (as judged by adults) might be explained by the fact that an averaged face made of 32 faces looks almost indistinguishable from any other 32-face averaged face even when they are created from a completely different set of individuals. It is thus possible that an average of only 32 facial exemplars is sufficient to approximate the population mean, and thus produce a prototype that is shared by almost everyone in a community. Kalakanis estimated that newborns see between 5 and 10 faces before they leave hospital in the USA. Thus, after 72 hours, they will have abstracted a prototypical face that is very close to the community's norm. Faces are an important class of visual stimuli for humans, and the perception of "faceness" is a critical part of social responsiveness. Because of the importance of the information conveyed by faces for social interaction, humans should therefore have innate preferences for them as a category, with its associated prototype. This prototype's special attractiveness (over the attractiveness of, for instance, the prototypical "chair") is probably related to the evolutionary importance of the mutant-freeness that the prototypical face represents.

It has been argued that composite faces are more symmetrical than their original images, and that this is what accounts for their attractiveness. Symmetry is thought to be preferred because it possibly indicates developmental stability in a changing environment, which would be an indicator of genetic quality in an individual. Developmental stability is the ability of an organism to buffer its development against environmental or genetic disturbances and produce a specific phenotype. If individuals are not of high genetic quality, they may not be able to buffer their development against environmental fluctuations and this would result in asymmetries. Thus symmetry may serve as an honest signal of mate quality in both humans and animals. However Langlois, Roggman and Musselman found that when faces were divided down the middle two perfectly symmetrical faces could be created from the two halves, a "left face" consisting of the left half of the face and its mirror image, and a "right face" constructed in a similar manner. These two perfectly symmetrical faces could then be compared with the unaltered face. In all cases, except in the most unattractive original faces, the unaltered face was rated as more attractive than either of the perfectly symmetrical faces. Furthermore, when photographs of faces in profile were used (in which there is no symmetry between the front and back of the head) the average of these photographs was consistently judged to be the most attractive. Symmetry is therefore simply a component of an average face without being the primary or dominant contributor to the attractiveness of the composite face.

== See also ==
- Fluctuating asymmetry
- Neoteny
- Sexual selection
