= Guy Sircello =

American philosopher

Guy Sircello (1936–1992) was an American philosopher best known for his analytic approach to philosophical aesthetics.

== Biography ==
Guy Sircello was born in Tacoma, Washington, and attended Lincoln High School. His parents were Pete and Teresa Sircello, and he had a younger sister, Teresa. Upon high school graduation, he was awarded the prestigious George Baker full four-year scholarship to Reed College, in Portland, Oregon, and graduated in 1958 with a double major in philosophy and history. In 1960, he married Sharon Chapin, a fellow Reed graduate, and shortly after, they left New York for Hamburg, where he had a Fulbright grant to further his studies of Ernst Cassirer, the subject of his doctoral dissertation at Columbia University.

In Hamburg, the Sircello's first child, Maria Anne Sircello was born, and the family returned to New York with another daughter as well, an adopted daughter, Deborah Ruth Sircello. In New York, the family grew as the Sircellos also became foster parents to Deborah's brothers, Billie, Alexander, and Constantine (Stan). In 1963, another daughter, Pier Andrea, was born in New York City just prior to the family's move to Portland, so that Guy could join the Reed faculty. In Portland, in 1965, another daughter, Anne-Marie Sircello was born, not long after the death of Maria Anne, who had been born with multiple serious disabilities. In 1966, the entire family of eight moved to Irvine, and finally, in 1967, the final child of the Sircello family, Christopher Chapin Sircello, was born. Guy was an attentive and involved father, and enjoyed family camping outings to Yosemite, a three-month family camping trip to Europe, and visits to museums, concerts, and the ballet. He was a major influence, along with Sharon, in three of his children becoming professional dancers, two others becoming professional visual artists, and another an accomplished amateur pianist.

The Sircellos separated, and later divorced after 15 years of marriage.

Sircello was a professor of philosophy at the University of California Irvine from 1966 until his death in 1992 at the age of 55. He earned his PhD from Columbia University in 1965. He taught at Reed College before becoming a founding member of UC Irvine's Philosophy department. While at Irvine he served as associate dean of undergraduate studies from 1973 to 1977, dean of undergraduate studies from 1978 to 1983, chair of the Committee on Educational Policy from 1988 to 1989, and as the Philosophy Department's director of graduate studies from 1990 until his death. Sircello was active in the American Society for Aesthetics and served as the president of its Pacific Division from 1978 to 1979. His emphasis was in analytic philosophy of aesthetics, and he was best known for what he called his New Theory of Beauty

== Philosophical work ==
Sircello's book Love and Beauty (1989) provides a sketch of his theory, which encompasses such topics as arousal, expansion, sublimity, and indulgence. He considers the implications of his theory for aesthetics and ethics. He also develops theories of pleasure, quality, beauty and love.

=== Introduction ===
According to Sircello, philosophers have usually failed to understand and theorize properly about certain fundamental human modalities. Among these is the human relation to and feeling for beauty. In particular, Sircello was dismayed that among philosophers the ancient conception of love of beauty had been displaced by other human concerns. His last book, Love and Beauty, was intended to provide a theory to begin to fill the void left by this loss of interest.

=== Pleasure ===
Sircello distinguishes pleasure from enjoyment. He uses propositional pleasure as an example of a particular type of pleasure distinct from enjoyment. Propositional pleasure is characterized as a pleasure taken in the occurrence of a fact, event, state or the like. Such pleasure is relatively passive. We may take pleasure in the outcome of a ball game or in the fact that traffic is light on the way to work, but the pleasure itself resulting from this satisfaction is something that happens to the subject rather than something they effect. Enjoyment is constituted by the active role played by the subject. Enjoyment can be obtained from experiences that are not entirely pleasant in all their parts via effort or resolve on the part of the subject. For instance, a strenuous hike can be enjoyable even though parts of it may be difficult and painful. The subject's resolve and ability to overcome difficulties can make the hike enjoyable despite these troubles. Enjoyment involves a complex relationship to desire in that enjoyment tends to fuel further desires for its continuation. As such enjoyment of experience is fundamental in Sircello's theory of love.

=== Qualities ===
Central to Sircello's philosophy is his theory of qualities. He defines the precise sense in which he uses this term through the concept of Properties of Qualitative Difference (or PQDs). Such properties are to be distinguished from quantitative properties. According to his theory, it is the perception of qualities that lies at the center of the experience of beauty. According to Sircello qualities come in four main varieties. These constitute four ways in which we experience our world.

- Qualities that qualify our own actions: Qualities such as those we experience when we perceive or remember our own actions fall in this category. Two examples used by Sircello are “my gentleness when I speak” and “my efficiency when I work”. These qualities comprise a major part of our experience of ourselves in our everyday lives.
- Qualities that we experience as qualifying the actions of others: We may experience the grace of another’s movements, or the stubbornness of their attitude. Sircello also includes in this category qualities perceived as being expressed by others in photographs, movies, painting, sculptures and so on. So, we may perceive another's stolidness or joviality in a photo or video as well in first hand encounters.
- Qualities that are experienced as “tracks” of the actions of ourselves or of others: Sircello defines “tracks” as “objects” that we may experience as the result of actions of sentient beings, either ourself or others. Tracks need not actually be the result of such actions but are objects that can be perceived as such, in the way that a landscape might be regarded as a trace of the hand of a creator. Sircello provides many examples of tracks in his book. For example, the mark left by the tracing of your hand in the sand or the streak of light left by the movement of a firework sparkler through the air.
- Qualities experienced by a person as belonging to an “object” of any sort under the following two conditions: a) the quality is experienced as either like the act, trace or representation of an act of a sentient being and b) the quality is experienced by that person as belonging to that act, trace or representation: Perhaps too briefly, the quality may be experienced as being an act of the “object” being considered. Examples of this type of quality are: “A calm sea might be seen as if it were resting calmly. In the delicate rustling of the leaves of a tree we might see the tree as delicately moving its limbs."

=== Beauty ===
Common wisdom tells us that beauty is in the eye of the beholder. Sircello's philosophy runs counter to this maxim. He maintained that beauty is objective in a very particular way. His starting point is the recognition that when a judgment of beauty is made there is something about the object that is thought to be beautiful. For example, if an alpine sunset seen as beautiful, this is due to the quality of light expressed in the sunset, or perhaps because of the intense depth of the vista, or because of some other attribute of the scene that stands out as exceptional in some way. Beauty resides for Sircello in the possession by objects, scenes, actions, and so on of qualities to a very high degree. Qualities of lack, deficiency or defect are excluded from this because these qualities are not enjoyed qualities.

=== Love ===
Sircello begins his account of love by setting it in relation to enjoyment. To distance some of the standard associations with the term “love,” Sircello uses the capitalized form, Love, in a technical sense. Fundamental to his theory is the notion of reproducing an experience of a quality. Reproductions by S a subject may be regarded as recollections, repetitions or recreations of images, memories, thoughts, actions, feelings, or states that are parts of the experience. Sircello presents his theory through the four principles paraphrased below:

1. For any subject S, any quality for S (Qs), and any experience of Qs by S, if S is Loving this experience, then there is some part or parts of the experience that S is reproducing such that what S produces are themselves parts of the experience.
2. For any subject S, any quality for S (Qs), and any experience of Qs by S, S is Loving this experience only if the S's reproducing parts of the experience both arouses and satisfies S's desire to so reproduce.
3. For any subject S, any quality for S (Qs), and any experience of Qs by S, if S is reproducing part or parts of the experience such that what S so reproduces are part(s) of the experience, and if such reproducing both arouses and satisfies S's desire to so reproduce, then S is Loving the experience.
4. For any subject S and any “object” for S, if S is Loving the “object”, then there is (at least) some experience for S involved with the “object” that S is Loving.

== Selected works ==
Books by Guy Sircello

- Mind & Art: An Essay on the Varieties of Expression. Princeton, NJ: Princeton University Press, 1972. Paperback, 1978.
- A New Theory of Beauty. Princeton Essays on the Arts, 1. Princeton, NJ: Princeton University Press, 1975.
- Love and Beauty. Princeton, NJ: Princeton University Press, 1989.

Selected articles not in UCI's bibliography

- "Beauty and Anti-Beauty in Literature and its Criticism." Midwest Studies In Philosophy, 16: 104–122.
- "How Is a Theory of the Sublime Possible?" The Journal of Aesthetics and Art Criticism, Vol. 51, No. 4 (Autumn, 1993), pp. 541–550
