= Koinophilia =

Hypothesis on normative mate selection

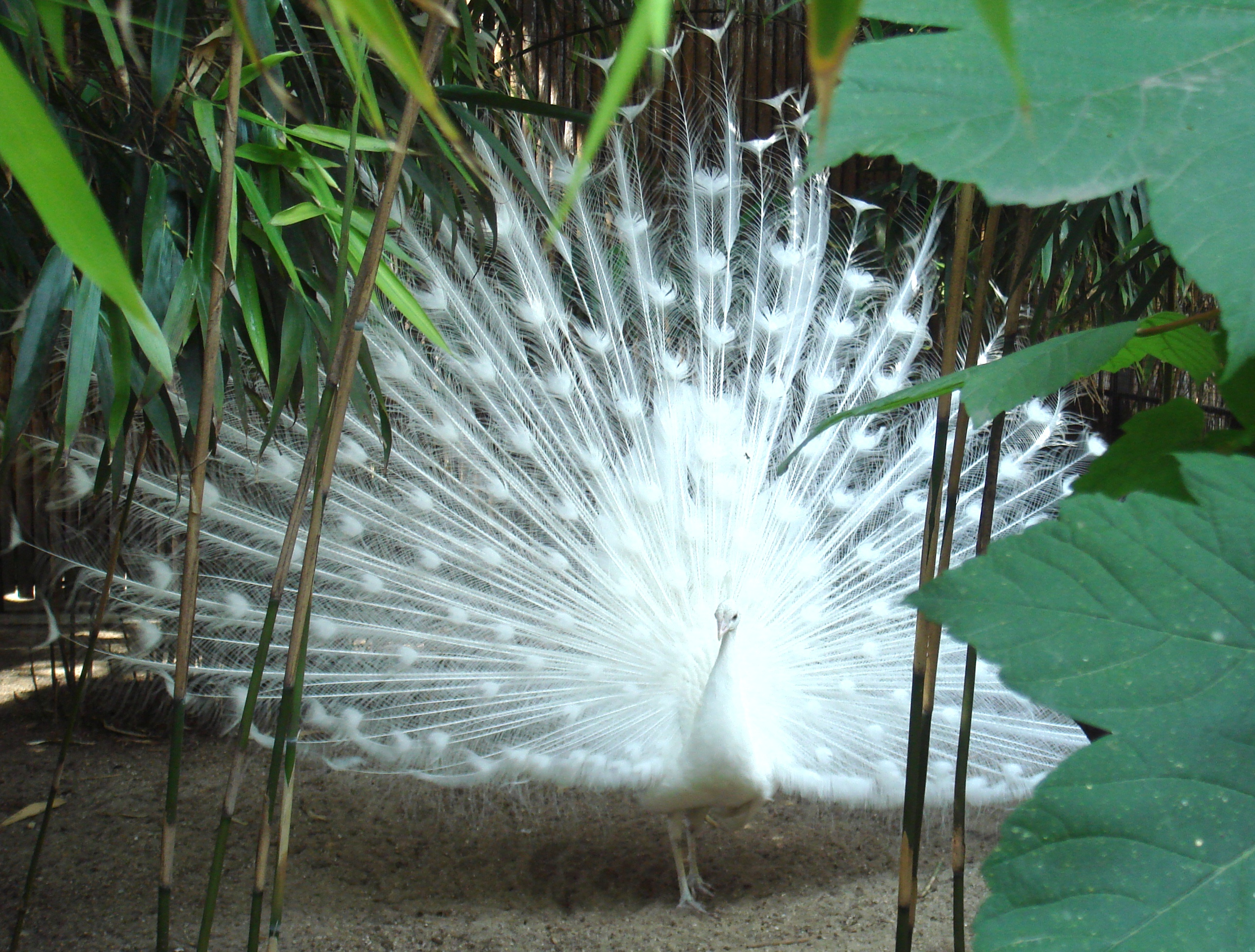
This leucistic Indian peacock, Pavo cristatus, is unlikely to find a mate and reproduce in a natural setting due to its unusual coloration. However, its striking colour is appreciated by humans, and may be included in artificial selective breeding to produce more individuals with the leucistic phenotype.

Koinophilia is an evolutionary hypothesis proposing that during sexual selection, animals preferentially seek mates with a minimum of unusual or mutant features, including functionality, appearance and behavior. Koinophilia intends to explain the clustering of sexual organisms into species and other issues described by Darwin's dilemma. The term derives from the Greek word koinos meaning 'common' or 'that which is shared', and philia, meaning 'fondness'.

Natural selection causes beneficial inherited features to become more common at the expense of their disadvantageous counterparts. The koinophilia hypothesis proposes that a sexually reproducing animal would therefore be expected to avoid individuals with rare or unusual features, and to prefer to mate with individuals displaying a predominance of common or average features. Mutants with peculiar features would be avoided because most mutations that manifest themselves as changes in appearance, functionality or behavior are disadvantageous. Because it is impossible to judge whether a new mutation is beneficial (or might be advantageous in the unforeseeable future) or not, koinophilic animals avoid them all, at the cost of avoiding the very occasional potentially beneficial mutation. Thus, koinophilia, although not infallible in its ability to distinguish fit from unfit mates, is a good strategy when choosing a mate. A koinophilic choice ensures that offspring are likely to inherit a suite of features and attributes that have served all the members of the species well in the past.

Koinophilia differs from the "like prefers like" mating pattern of assortative mating. If like preferred like, leucistic animals (such as white peacocks) would be sexually attracted to one another, and a leucistic subspecies would come into being. Koinophilia predicts that this is unlikely because leucistic animals are attracted to the average in the same way as are all the other members of its species. Since non-leucistic animals are not attracted by leucism, few leucistic individuals find mates, and leucistic lineages will rarely form.

Koinophilia provides simple explanations for the almost universal canalization of sexual creatures into species, the rarity of transitional forms between species (between both extant and fossil species), evolutionary stasis, punctuated equilibria, and the evolution of cooperation. Koinophilia might also contribute to the maintenance of sexual reproduction, preventing its reversion to the much simpler asexual form of reproduction.

The koinophilia hypothesis is supported by the findings of Judith Langlois and her co-workers. They found that the average of two human faces was more attractive than either of the faces from which that average was derived. The more faces (of the same gender and age) that were used in the averaging process the more attractive and appealing the average face became. This work into averageness supports koinophilia as an explanation of what constitutes a beautiful face.

== Speciation and punctuated equilibria ==
Biologists from Darwin onwards have puzzled over how evolution produces species whose adult members look extraordinarily alike, and distinctively different from the members of other species. Lions and leopards are, for instance, both large carnivores that inhabit the same general environment, and hunt much the same prey, but look quite different. The question is why intermediates do not exist.

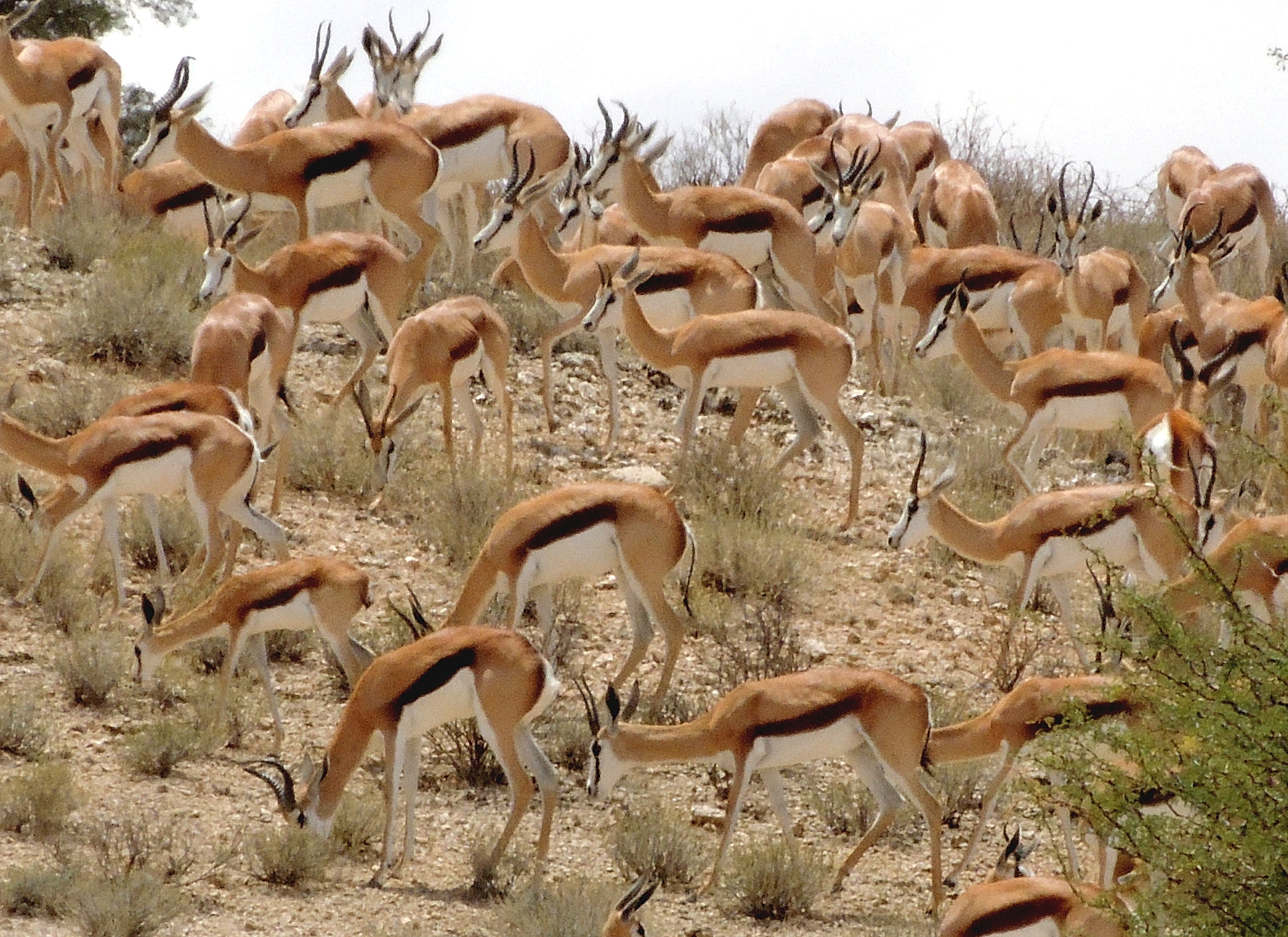
The overwhelming impression of strict uniformity, involving all the external features of the adult members of a species, is illustrated by this herd of springbok, Antidorcas marsupialis, in the Kalahari Desert. This homogeneity in appearance is typical, and virtually diagnostic, of almost all species, and a great evolutionary mystery. Darwin emphasized individual variation, which is unquestionably present in any herd such as this, but is extraordinarily difficult to discern, even after long-term familiarity with the herd. Each individual needs to be uniquely and prominently tagged to follow its life history and interactions with the other (tagged) members of the population.

This is the "horizontal" dimension of a two-dimensional problem, referring to the almost complete absence of transitional or intermediate forms between present-day species (e.g. between lions, leopards, and cheetahs).

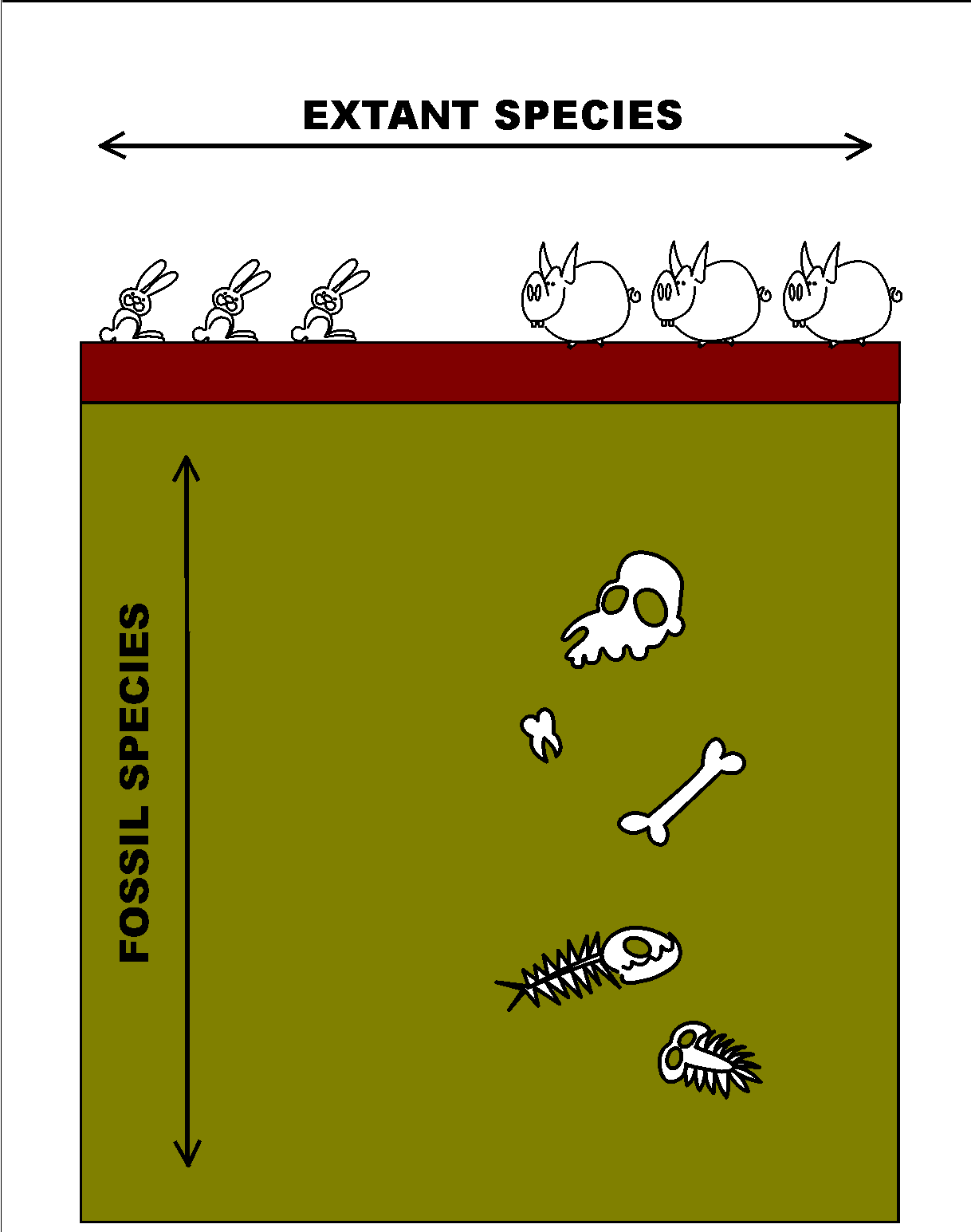
Speciation poses a "2-dimensional" problem. The discontinuities in appearance between existing species represent the "horizontal dimension" of the problem. The succession of fossil species represent the "vertical dimension".

The "vertical" dimension concerns the fossil record. Fossil species are frequently remarkably stable over extremely long periods of geological time, despite continental drift, major climate changes, and mass extinctions. When a change in form occurs, it tends to be abrupt in geological terms, again producing phenotypic gaps (i.e. an absence of intermediate forms), but now between successive species, which then often co-exist for long periods of time. Thus the fossil record suggests that evolution occurs in bursts, interspersed by long periods of evolutionary stagnation in so-called punctuated equilibria. Why this is so has been an evolutionary enigma ever since Darwin first recognized the problem.

Koinophilia could explain both the horizontal and vertical manifestations of speciation, and why it, as a general rule, involves the entire external appearance of the animals concerned. Since koinophilia affects the entire external appearance, the members of an interbreeding group are driven to look alike in every detail. Each interbreeding group will rapidly develop its own characteristic appearance. An individual from one group which wanders into another group will consequently be recognized as different, and will be discriminated against during the mating season. Reproductive isolation induced by koinophilia might thus be the first crucial step in the development of, ultimately, physiological, anatomical and behavioral barriers to hybridization, and thus, ultimately, full specieshood. Koinophilia will thereafter defend that species' appearance and behavior against invasion by unusual or unfamiliar forms (which might arise by immigration or mutation), and thus be a paradigm of punctuated equilibria (or the "vertical" aspect of the speciation problem).

== Evolution under koinophilic conditions ==
Plants and domestic animals and can differ markedly from their wild ancestors

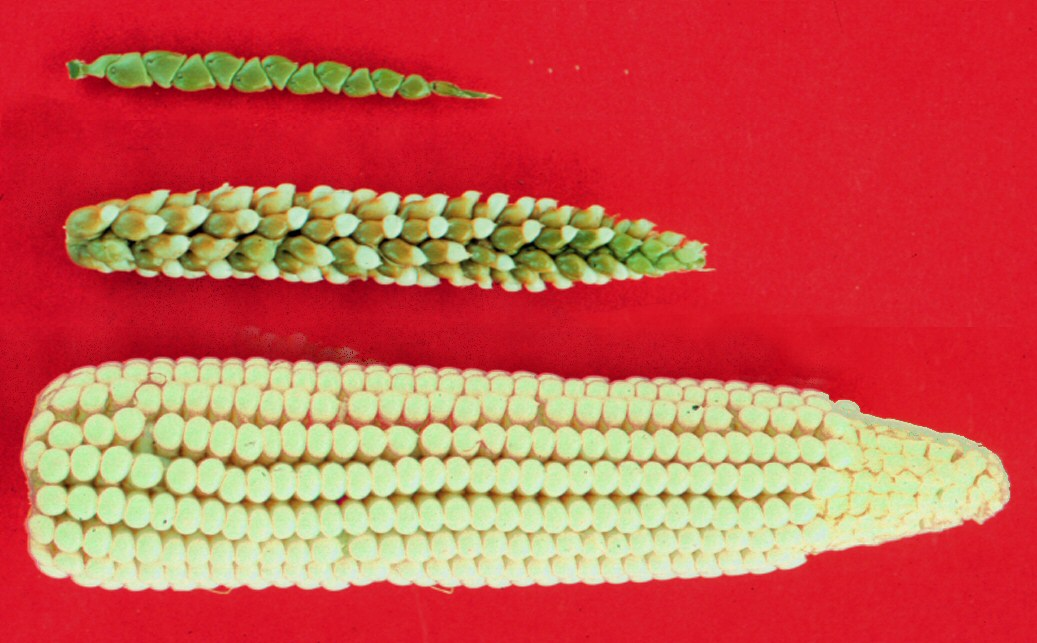
Top: wild teosinte; middle: maize-teosinte hybrid; bottom: maize

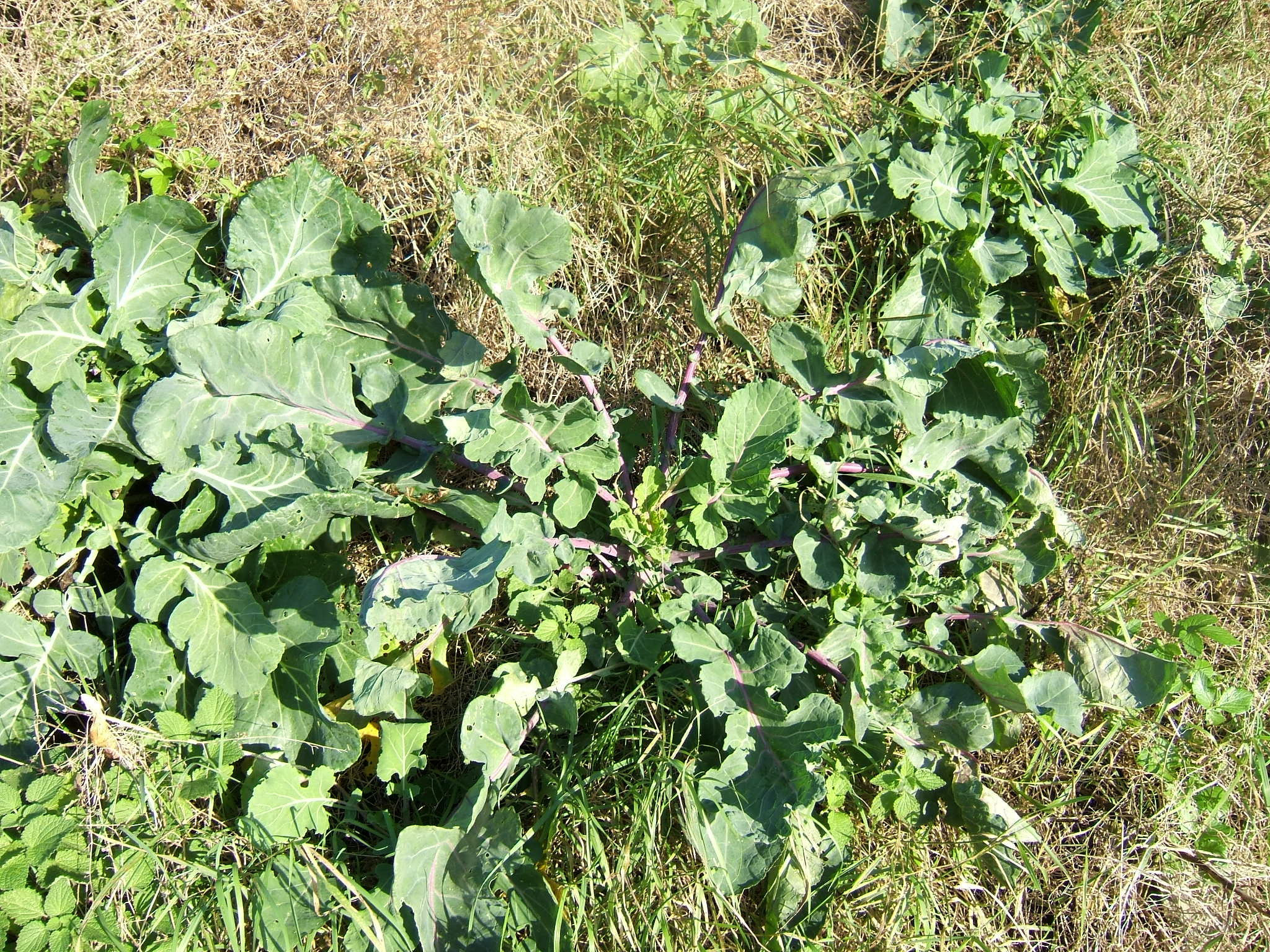
Ancestral wild cabbage

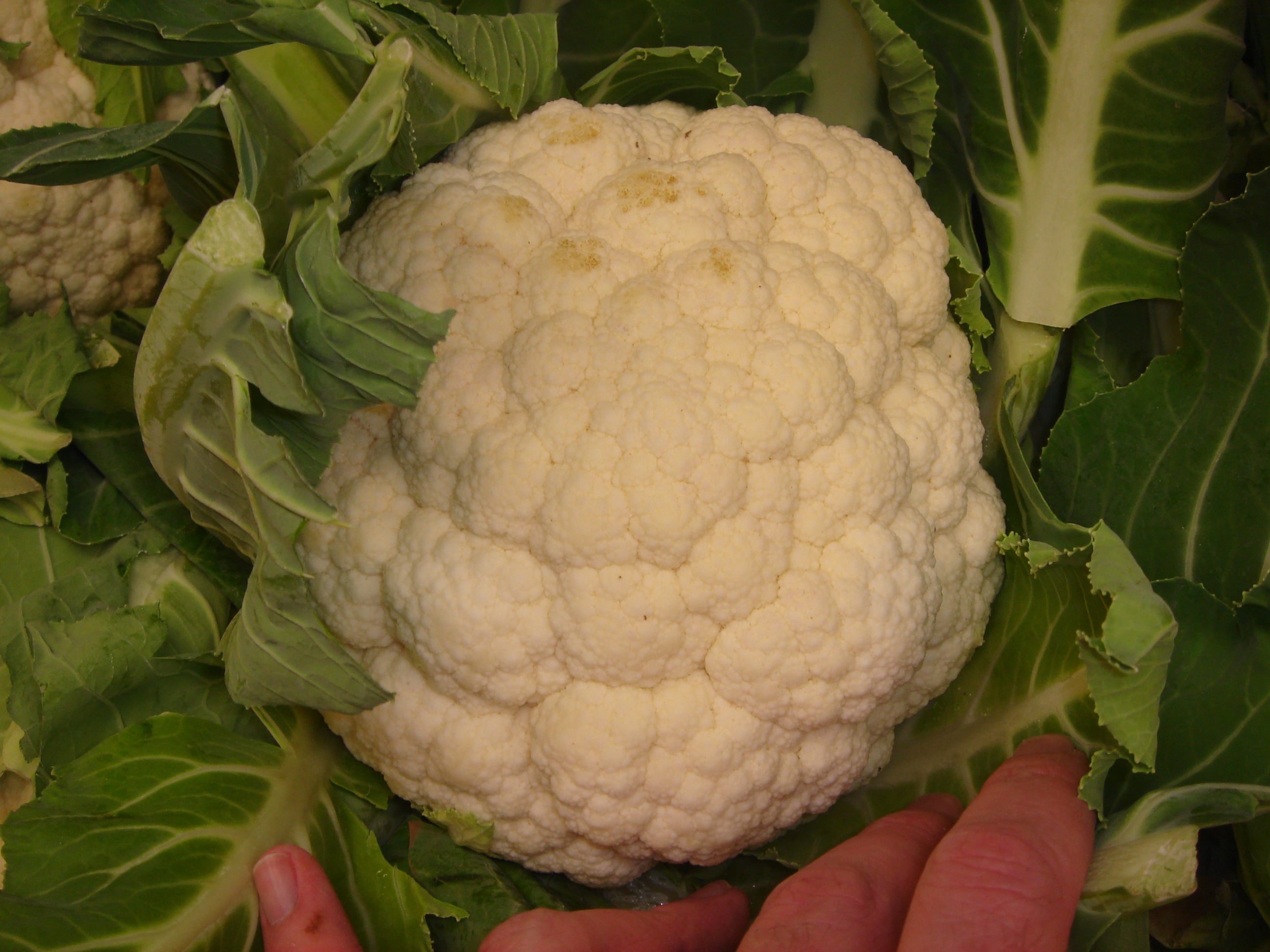
Domesticated cauliflower

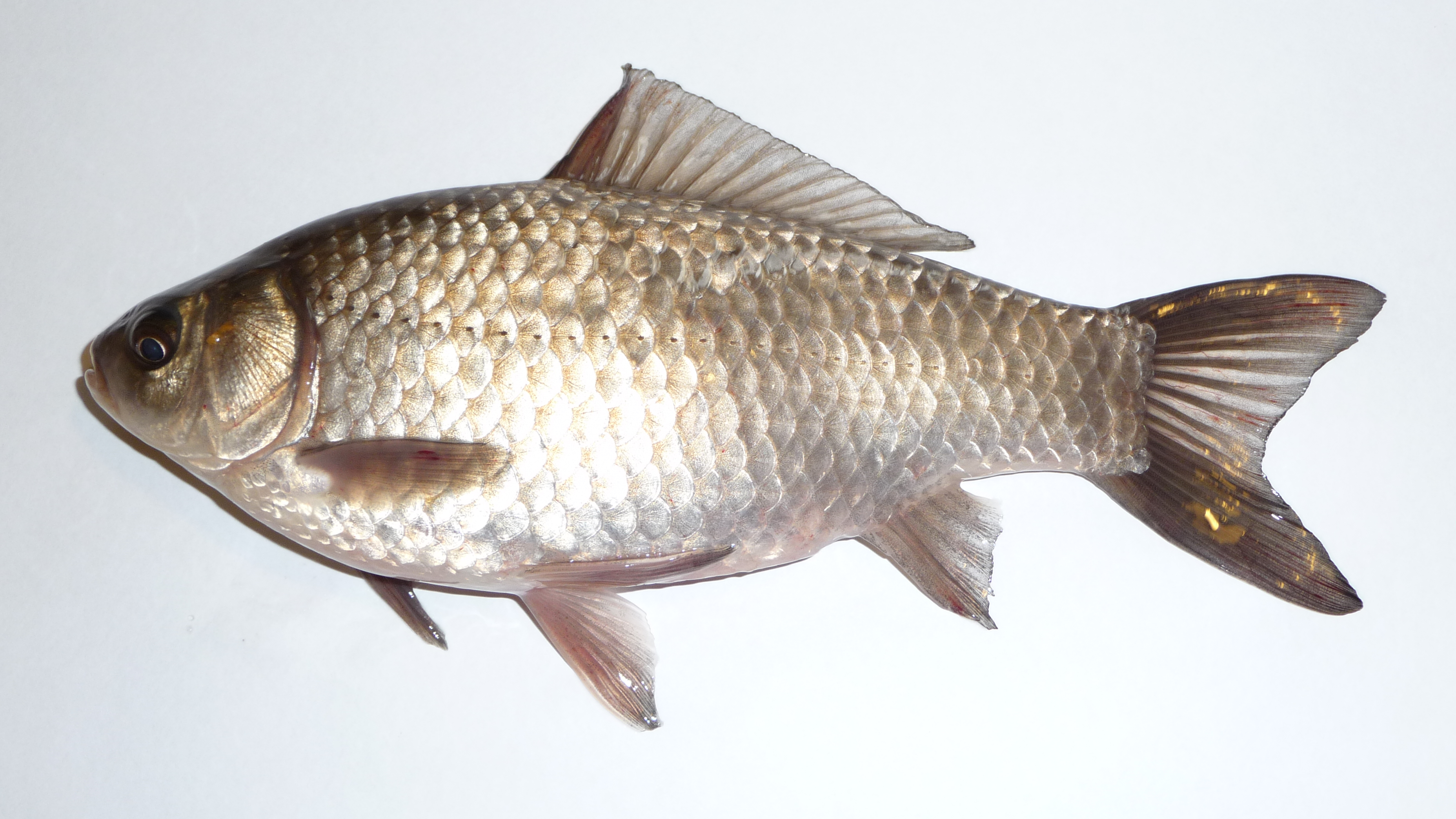
Ancestral prussian carp

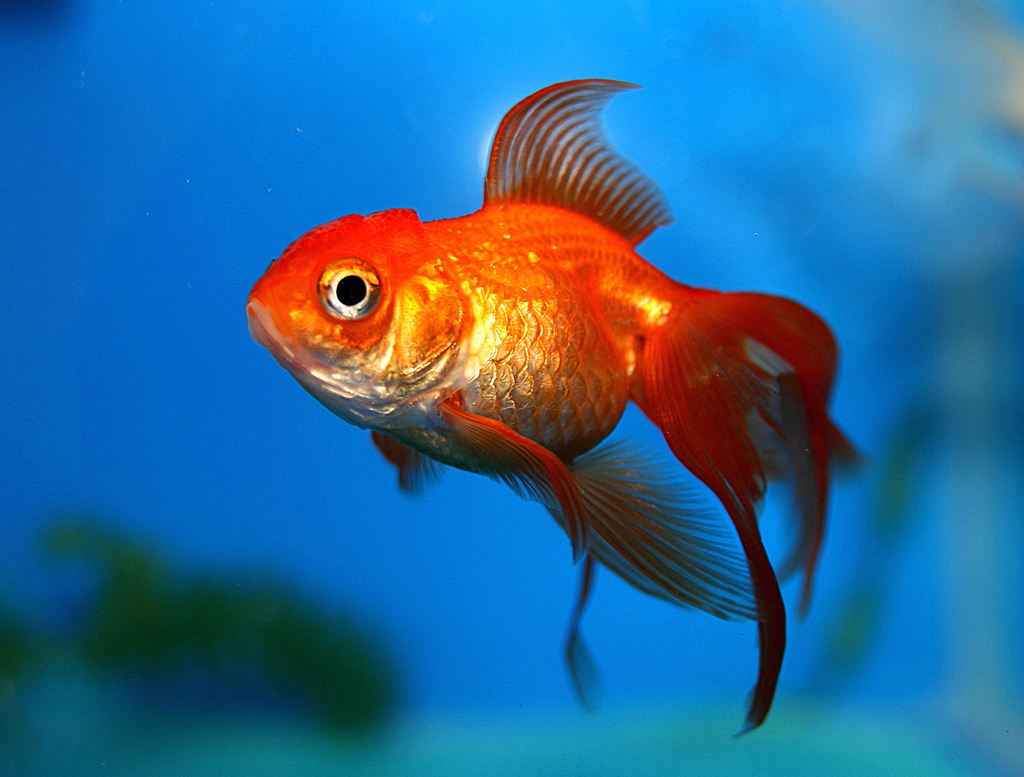
Domestic gold fish

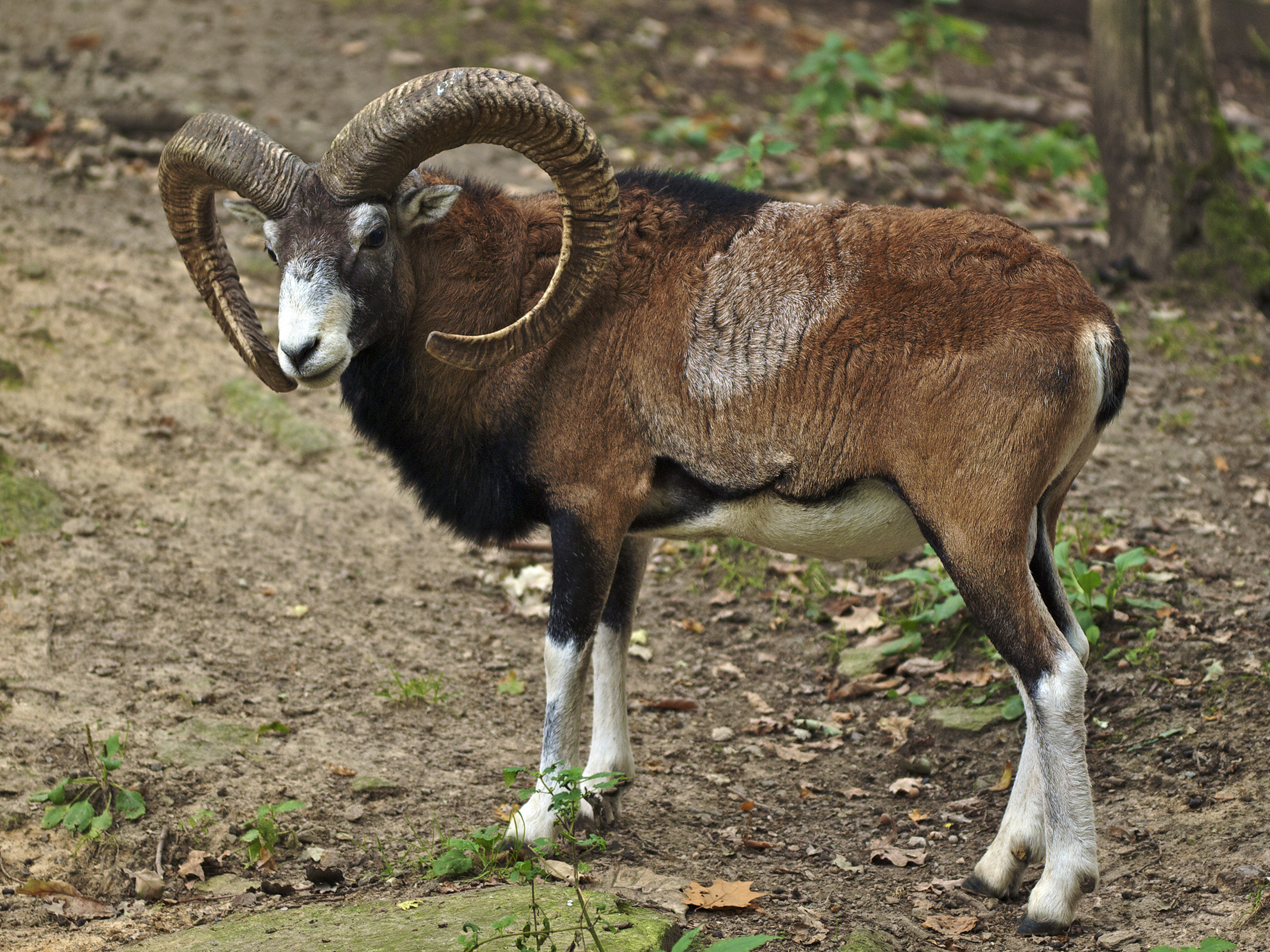
Ancestral mouflon

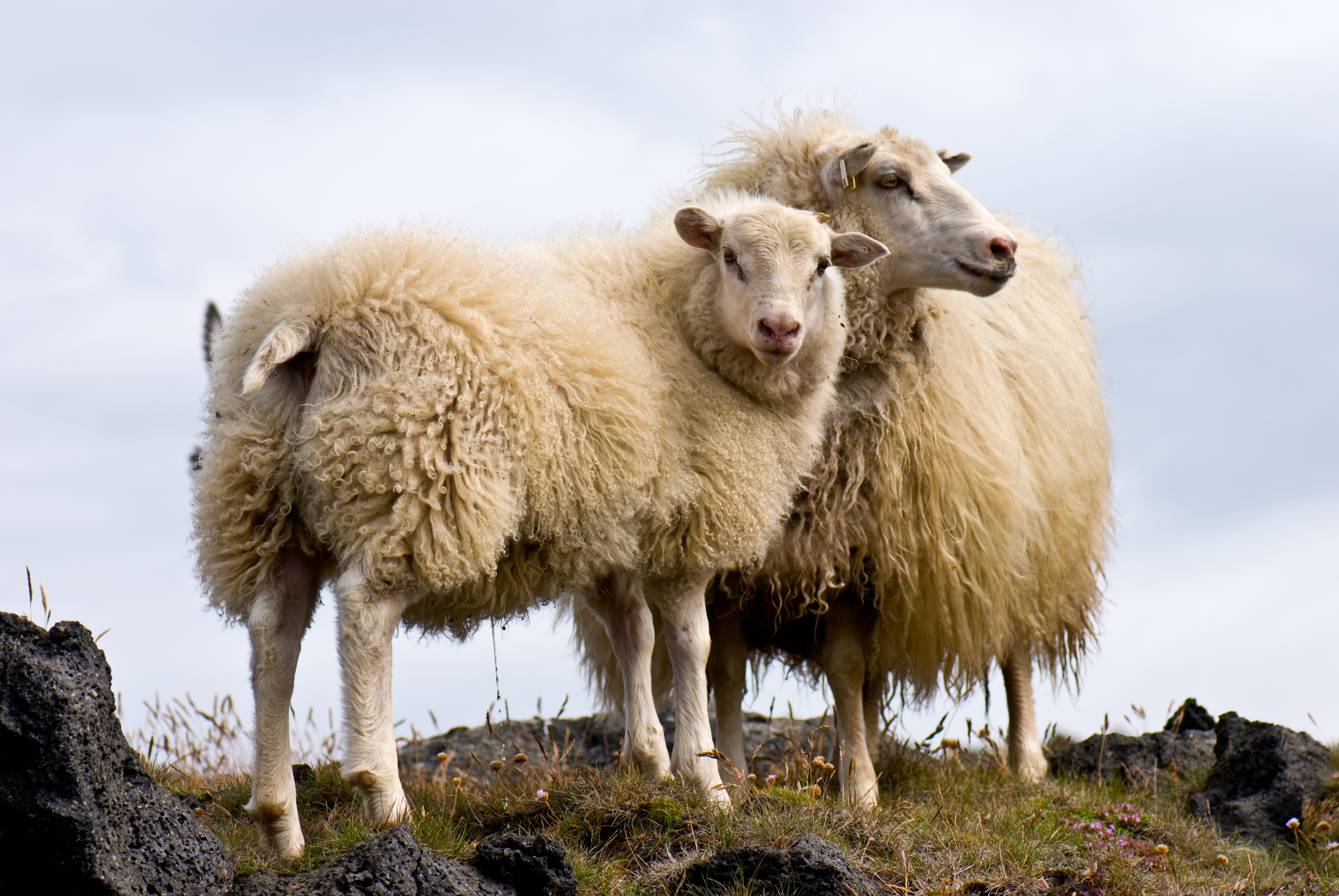
Domestic sheep

More detailed version of diagram on left by geographical area

=== Background ===
Evolution can be extremely rapid, as shown by the creation of domesticated animals and plants in a very short period of geological time, spanning only a few tens of thousands of years, by humans with little or no knowledge of genetics. Maize, Zea mays, for instance, was created in Mexico in only a few thousand years, starting about 7 000 to 12 000 years ago. This raises the question of why the long term rate of evolution is far slower than is theoretically possible.

Evolution is imposed on species or groups. It is not planned or striven for in some Lamarckist way. The mutations on which the process depends are random events, and, except for the "silent mutations" which do not affect the functionality or appearance of the carrier, are thus usually disadvantageous, and their chance of proving to be useful in the future is vanishingly small. Therefore, while a species or group might benefit by being able to adapt to a new environment through the accumulation of a wide range of genetic variation, this is to the detriment of the individuals who have to carry these mutations until a small, unpredictable minority of them ultimately contributes to such an adaptation. Thus, the capability to evolve is a group adaptation, which has been discredited by, among others, George C. Williams, John Maynard Smith and Richard Dawkins. because it is not to the benefit of the individual.

Consequently, sexual individuals would be expected to avoid transmitting mutations to their progeny by avoiding mates with strange or unusual characteristics. Mutations that therefore affect the external appearance and habits of their carriers will seldom be passed on to the next and subsequent generations. They will therefore seldom be tested by natural selection. Evolutionary change in a large population with a wide choice of mates, will, therefore, come to a virtual standstill. The only mutations that can accumulate in a population are ones that have no noticeable effect on the outward appearance and functionality of their bearers (they are thus termed "silent" or "neutral mutations").

=== Evolutionary process ===
The restraint koinophilia exerts on phenotypic change suggests that evolution can only occur if mutant mates cannot be avoided as a result of a severe scarcity of potential mates. This is most likely to occur in small restricted communities, such as on small islands, in remote valleys, lakes, river systems, caves, or during periods of glaciation, or following mass extinctions, when sudden bursts of evolution can be expected. Under these circumstances, not only is the choice of mates severely restricted, but population bottlenecks, founder effects, genetic drift and inbreeding cause rapid, random changes in the isolated population's genetic composition. Furthermore, hybridization with a related species trapped in the same isolate might introduce additional genetic changes. If an isolated population such as this survives its genetic upheavals, and subsequently expands into an unoccupied niche, or into a niche in which it has an advantage over its competitors, a new species, or subspecies, will have come in being. In geological terms this will be an abrupt event. A resumption of avoiding mutant mates will, thereafter, result, once again, in evolutionary stagnation.

Thus the fossil record of an evolutionary progression typically consists of species that suddenly appear, and ultimately disappear hundreds of thousands or millions of years later, without any change in external appearance. Graphically, these fossil species are represented by horizontal lines, whose lengths depict how long each of them existed. The horizontality of the lines illustrates the unchanging appearance of each of the fossil species depicted on the graph. During each species' existence new species appear at random intervals, each also lasting many hundreds of thousands of years before disappearing without a change in appearance. The degree of relatedness and the lines of descent of these concurrent species is generally impossible to determine. This is illustrated in the following diagram depicting the evolution of modern humans from the time that the hominins separated from the line that led to the evolution of our closest living primate relatives, the chimpanzees.

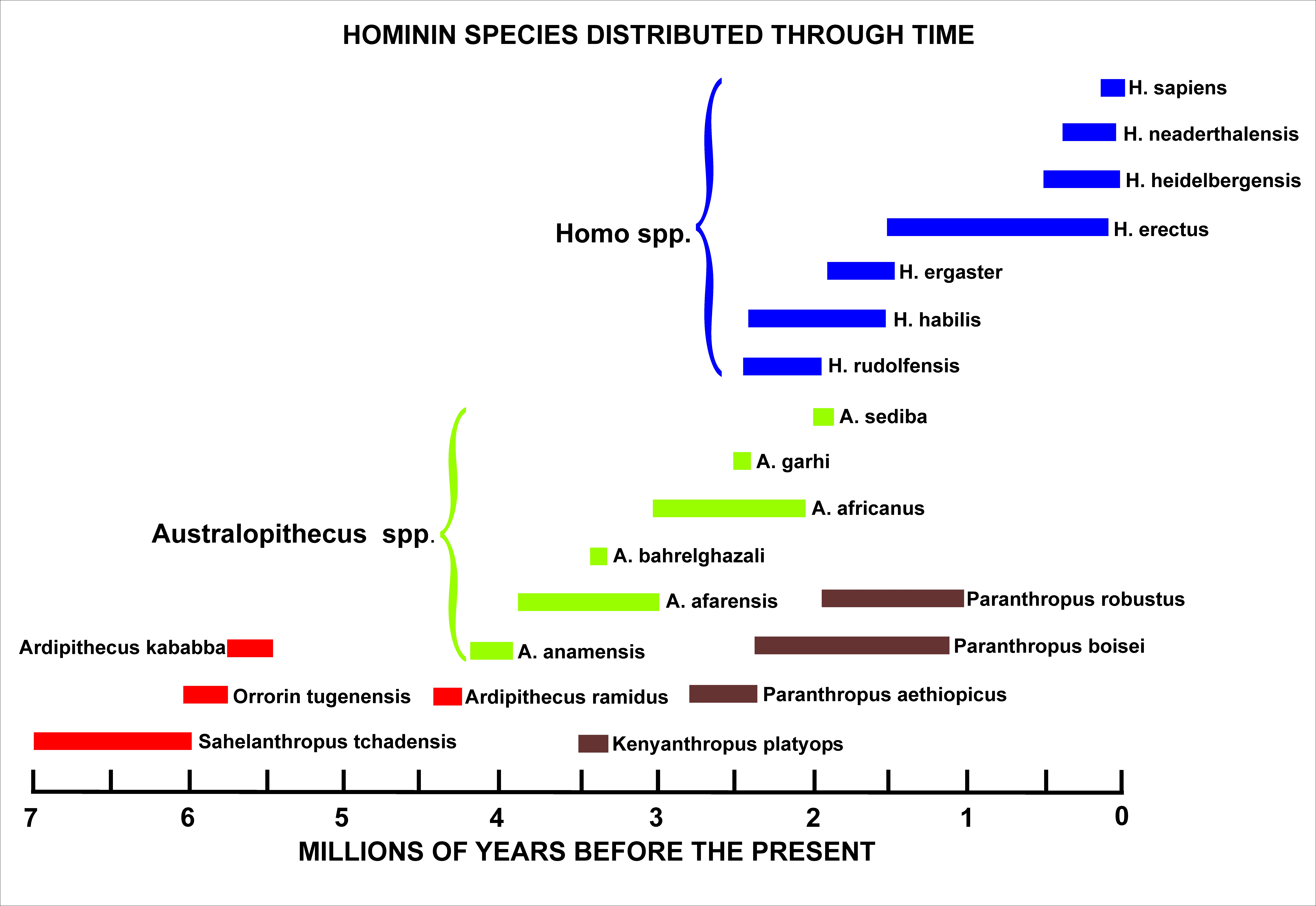
Distribution of Hominin species over time. For examples of similar evolutionary timelines see the paleontological list of African dinosaurs, Asian dinosaurs, the Lampriformes and the Amiiformes.

=== Phenotypic implications ===
This proposal, that population bottlenecks are possibly the primary generators of the variation that fuels evolution, predicts that evolution will usually occur in intermittent, relatively large scale morphological steps, interspersed with prolonged periods of evolutionary stagnation, instead of in a continuous series of finely graded changes. However, it makes a further prediction. Darwin emphasized that the shared biologically useless oddities and incongruities that characterize a species are signs of an evolutionary history – something that would not be expected if a bird's wing, for instance, was engineered de novo, as argued by his detractors. The present model predicts that, in addition to vestiges which reflect an organism's evolutionary heritage, all the members of a given species will also bear the stamp of their isolationary past – arbitrary, random features, accumulated through founder effects, genetic drift and the other genetic consequences of sexual reproduction in small, isolated communities. Thus all lions, African and Asian, have a highly characteristic black tuft of fur at the end of their tails, which is difficult to explain in terms of an adaptation, or as a vestige from an early feline, or more ancient ancestor. The unique, often color- and pattern-rich plumage of each of today's wide variety of bird species presents a similar evolutionary enigma. This richly varied array of phenotypes is more easily explained as the products of isolates, subsequently defended by koinophilia, than as assemblies of very diverse evolutionary relics, or as sets of uniquely evolved adaptations.

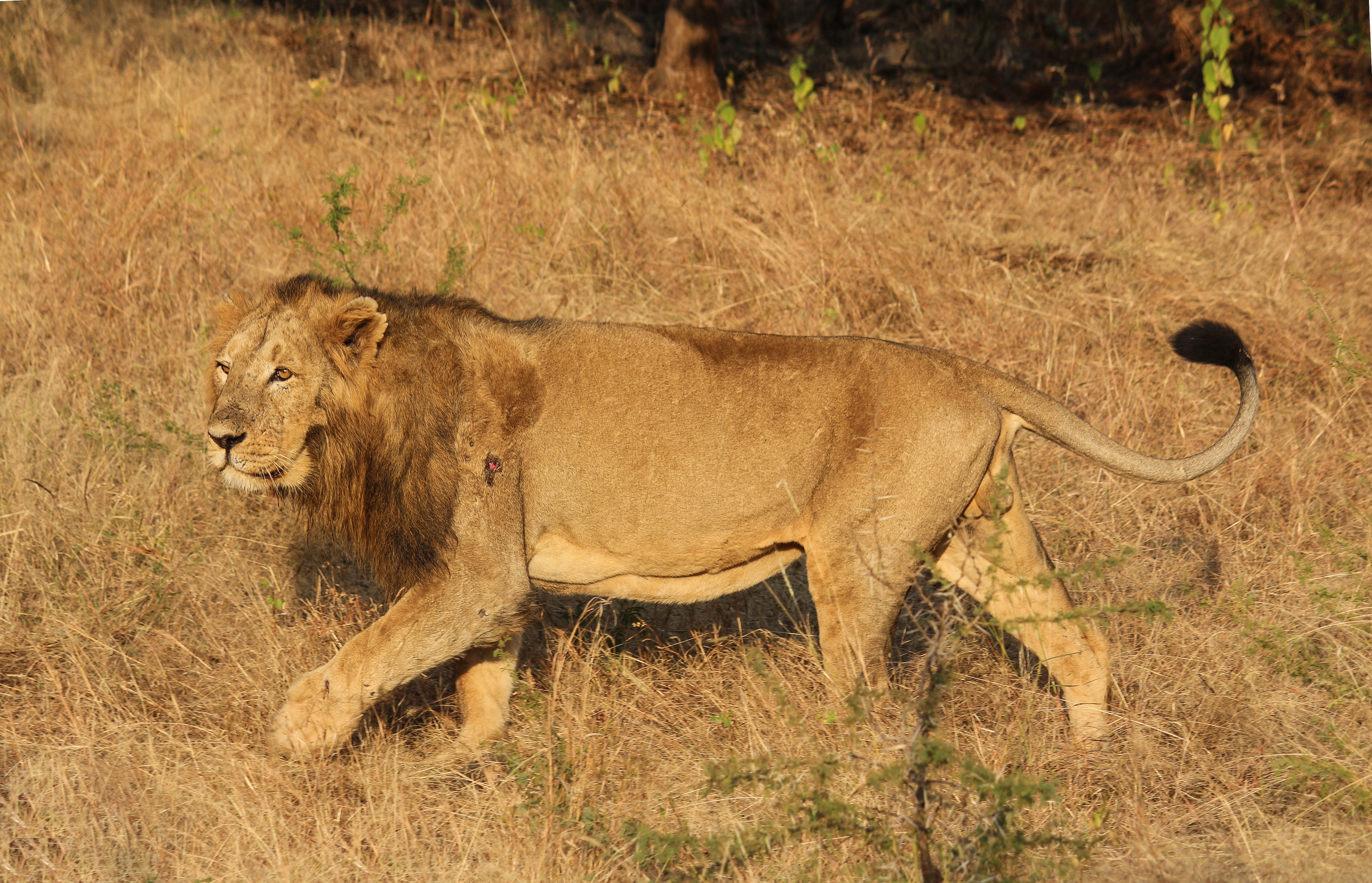
The black tuft of fur at the end of this Asiatic lion's tail is difficult to explain as an evolutionary vestige, or adaptation. Yet it occurs in all lions.

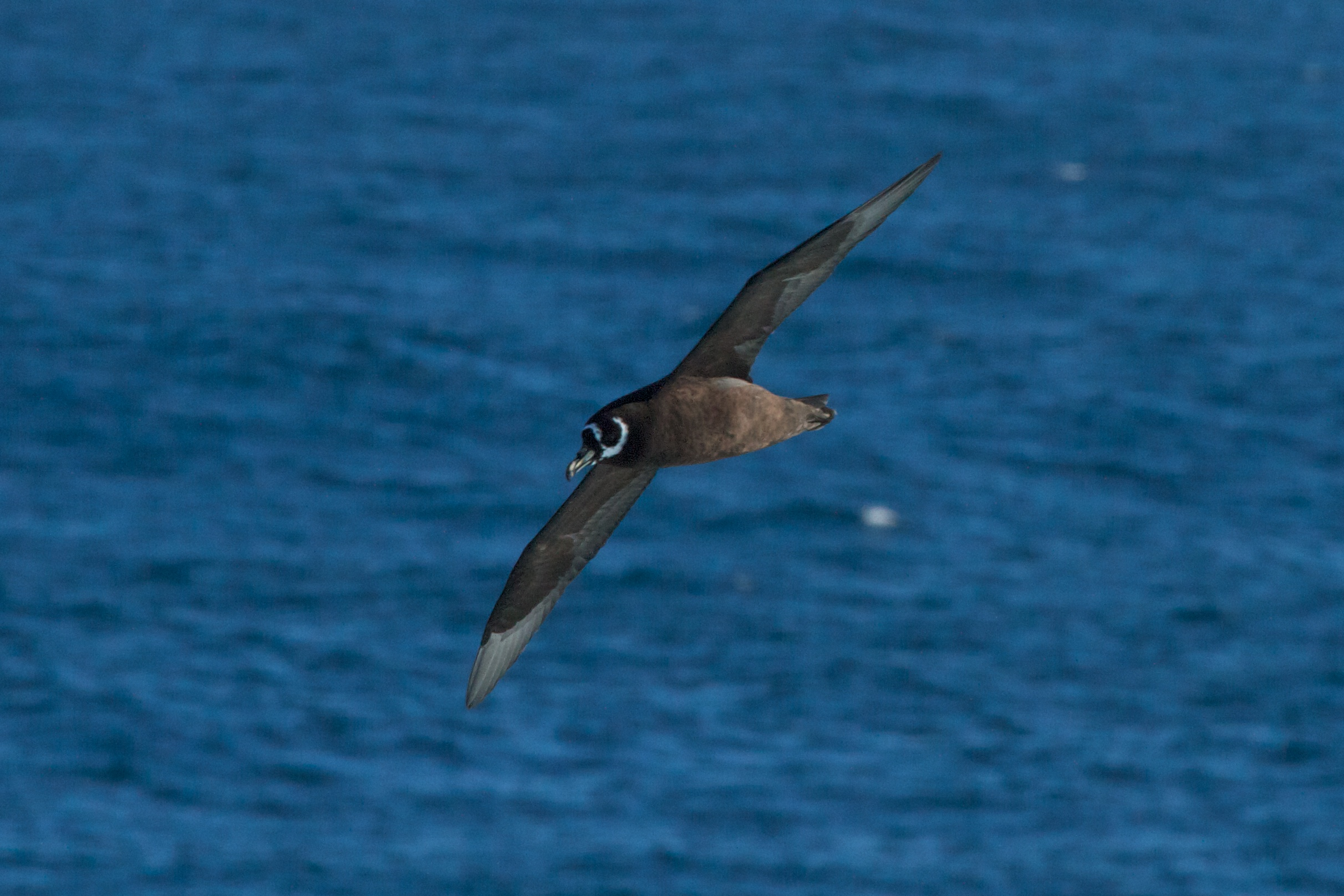
The "spectacles" of the spectacled petrel, Procellaria conspicillata, represent an unexplained peculiarity of this species.

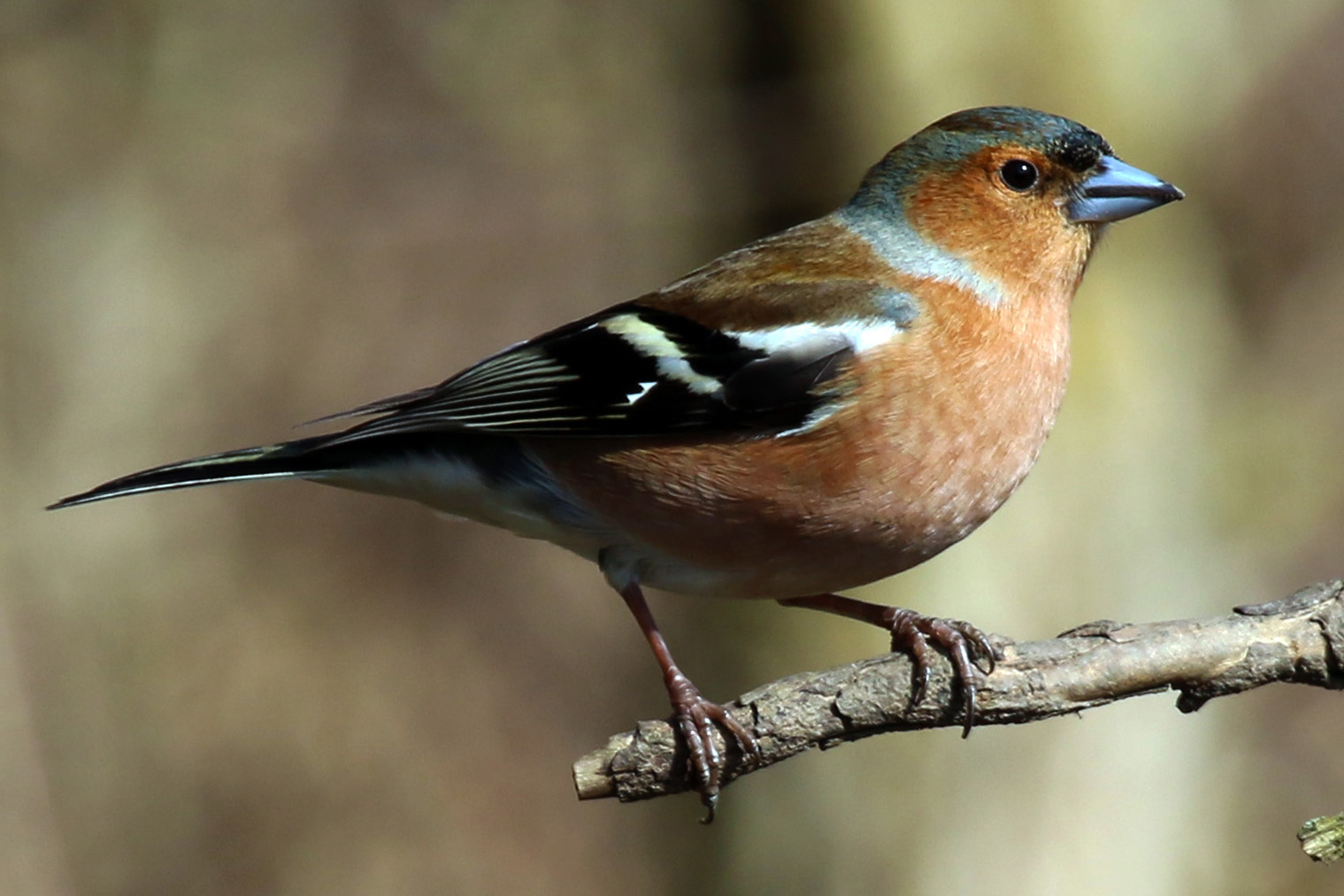
The unique plumage of the common chaffinch, Fringilla coelebs, unmistakably identifies the species, but its adaptive role is enigmatic.

=== Evolution of co-operation ===
Co-operation is any group behavior that benefits the individuals more than if they were to act as independent agents.

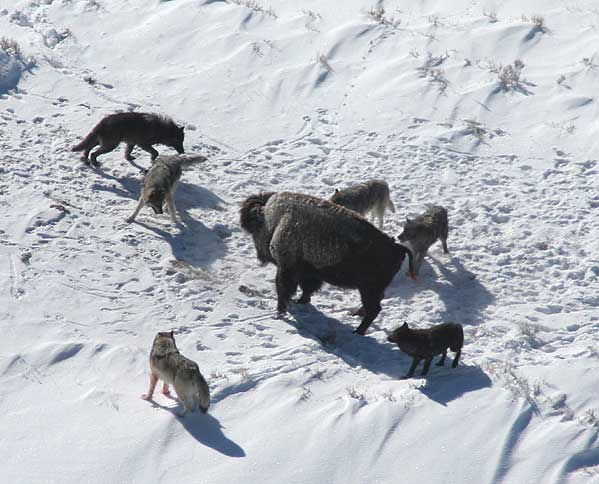
Co-operative hunting by wolves allows them to tackle much larger and more nutritious prey than any individual wolf could handle. However, such co-operation could be exploited by selfish individuals which do not expose themselves to the dangers of the hunt, but nevertheless share in the spoils.

However selfish individuals can exploit the co-operativeness of others by not taking part in the group activity, but still enjoying its benefits. For instance, a selfish individual which does not join the hunting pack and share in its risks, but nevertheless shares in the spoils, has a fitness advantage over the other members of the pack. Thus, although a group of co-operative individuals is fitter than an equivalent group of selfish individuals, selfish individuals interspersed among a community of co-operators are always fitter than their hosts. They will raise, on average, more offspring than their hosts, and will ultimately replace them.

If, however, the selfish individuals are ostracized, and rejected as mates, because of their deviant and unusual behavior, then their evolutionary advantage becomes an evolutionary liability. Co-operation then becomes evolutionarily stable.

== Effects of diets and environmental conditions ==
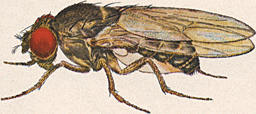
Male Drosophila pseudoobscura

The best-documented creations of new species in the laboratory were performed in the late 1980s. William Rice and G.W. Salt bred fruit flies, Drosophila melanogaster, using a maze with three different choices of habitat, such as light/dark and wet/dry. Each generation was placed into the maze, and the groups of flies that came out of two of the eight exits were set apart to breed with each other in their respective groups. After thirty-five generations, the two groups and their offspring were isolated reproductively because of their strong habitat preferences: they mated only within the areas they preferred, and so did not mate with flies that preferred the other areas. The history of such attempts is described in Rice and Hostert (1993).

Diane Dodd used a laboratory experiment to show how reproductive isolation can evolve in Drosophila pseudoobscura fruit flies after several generations by placing them in different media, starch- or maltose-based media.

Dodd's experiment has been easy for many others to replicate, including with other kinds of fruit flies and foods.

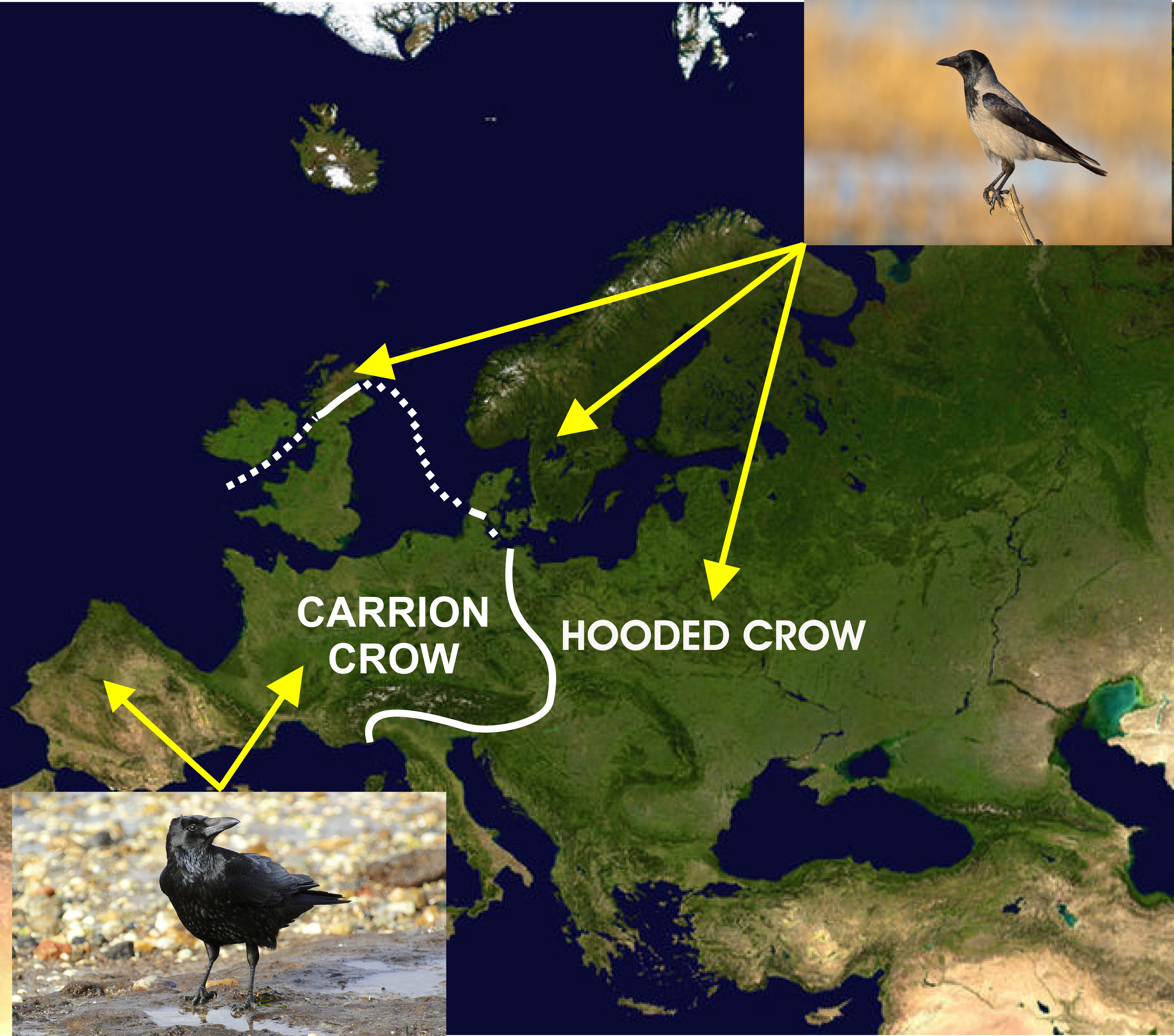
A map of Europe indicating the distribution of the carrion and hooded crows on either side of a contact zone (white line) separating the two species

The carrion crow (Corvus corone) and hooded crow (Corvus cornix) are two closely related species whose geographical distribution across Europe is illustrated in the accompanying diagram. It is believed that this distribution might have resulted from the glaciation cycles during the Pleistocene, which caused the parent population to split into isolates which subsequently re-expanded their ranges when the climate warmed causing secondary contact. Jelmer W. Poelstra and coworkers sequenced almost the entire genomes of both species in populations at varying distances from the contact zone to find that the two species were genetically identical, both in their DNA and in its expression (in the form of RNA), except for the lack of expression of a small portion (<0.28%) of the genome (situated on avian chromosome 18) in the hooded crow, which imparts the lighter plumage coloration on its torso. Thus the two species can viably hybridize, and occasionally do so at the contact zone, but the all-black carrion crows on the one side of the contact zone mate almost exclusively with other all-black carrion crows, while the same occurs among the hooded crows on the other side of the contact zone. It is therefore clear that it is only the outward appearance of the two species that inhibits hybridization. The authors attribute this to assortative mating, the advantage of which is not clear, and it would lead to the rapid appearance of streams of new lineages, and possibly even species, through mutual attraction between mutants. Unnikrishnan and Akhila propose, instead, that koinophilia is a more precise explanation for the resistance to hybridization across the contact zone, despite the absence of physiological, anatomical or genetic barriers to such hybridization.

== Reception ==
William B. Miller, in an extensive recent (2013) review of koinophilia theory, notes that while it provides precise explanations for the grouping of sexual animals into species, their unchanging persistence in the fossil record over long periods of time, and the phenotypic gaps between species, both fossil and extant, it represents a major departure from the widely accepted view that beneficial mutations spread, ultimately, to the whole, or some portion of the population (causing it to evolve gene by gene). Darwin recognized that this process had no inherent, or inevitable propensity to produce species. Instead populations would be in a perpetual state of transition both in time and space. They would, at any given moment, consist of individuals with varying numbers of beneficial characteristics that may or may not have reached them from their various points of origin in the population, and neutral features will have a scattering determined by random mechanisms such as genetic drift.

He also notes that koinophilia provides no explanation as to how the physiological, anatomical and genetic causes of reproductive isolation come about. It is only the behavioral reproductive isolation that is addressed by koinophilia. It is furthermore difficult to see how koinophilia might apply to plants, and certain marine creatures that discharge their gametes into the environment to meet up and fuse, it seems, entirely randomly (within conspecific confines). However, when pollen from several compatible donors is used to pollinate stigmata, the donors typically do not sire equal numbers of seeds. Marshall and Diggle state that the existence of some kind of non-random seed paternity is, in fact, not in question in flowering plants. How this occurs remains unknown. Pollen choice is one of the possibilities, taking into account that 50% of the pollen grain's haploid genome is expressed during its tube's growth towards the ovule.

The apparent preference of the females of certain, particularly bird, species for exaggerated male ornaments, such as the peacock's tail, is not easily reconciled with the concept of koinophilia.
