= Lee Altenberg =

American biologist

- Born: Lee Altenberg
- Education: University of California, Berkeley (BA); Stanford University (PhD)
- Scientific career
- Fields: Biological sciences
- Workplaces: University of Hawaiʻi at Mānoa; Konrad Lorenz Institute; Duke University; Ronin Institute
- Thesis: A Generalization of Theory on the Evolution of Modifier Genes (1984)
- Doctoral advisor: Marcus W. Feldman
- Other academic advisors: Glenys Thomson
- Website: dynamics.org/Altenberg/

Lee Altenberg is an American theoretical biologist. He is on the faculty of the Departments of Information and Computer Sciences and of Mathematics at the University of Hawaiʻi at Mānoa. He is best known for his work that helped establish the evolution of evolvability and modularity in the genotype–phenotype map as areas of investigation in evolutionary biology, for moving theoretical concepts between the fields of evolutionary biology and evolutionary computation, and for his mathematical unification and generalization of modifier gene models for the evolution of biological information transmission, putting under a single mathematical framework the evolution of mutation rates, recombination rates, sexual reproduction rates, and dispersal rates.

Altenberg is an associate editor of the journal BioSystems, and serves on the editorial boards of the journals Genetic Programming and Evolvable Machines and Artificial Life, and on the IEEE Computational Intelligence Society Task Force on Artificial Life and Complex Adaptive Systems.

He is the son of actress Elizabeth Lee.

== Education ==
Altenberg received his B.A. in genetics in 1980 at the University of California, Berkeley with an honors thesis advised by Glenys Thomson on the theory of frequency-dependent selection. He received his Ph.D. in biological sciences in 1985 at Stanford University with advisor Marcus W. Feldman with a dissertation that unified models of modifier gene evolution.

== Career ==
Altenberg held postdoctoral fellowships at Stanford University, North Carolina State University, and Duke University. While a postdoctoral fellow at Duke University, Altenberg offered the first course on evolutionary computation to be given there. When his father became ill with cryoglobulinemia, he moved with him to Hawaii for the warm temperatures. In 2002 Altenberg was appointed associate professor of Information and Computer Sciences at the University of Hawaiʻi at Mānoa. He again offered the first courses in evolutionary computation to be given there. In 2013 Altenberg was a Long-Term Visitor at the Mathematical Biosciences Institute at Ohio State University and in 2014–2016 was a Senior Fellow at the Konrad Lorenz Institute for Evolution and Cognition Research. The University of Hawaiʻi Board of Regents approved his promotion to Full Professor in 2020. Since 2013, Altenberg has been a Research Scholar at the Ronin Institute.

== Research ==
Altenberg's research focuses on uncovering the mathematical relationships within the dynamics of biological evolution, and evolutionary algorithms. He is particularly interested in higher order phenomena such as the evolution of evolvability, the evolution of genetic information transmission, and the evolution of the genotype–phenotype map. His chief accomplishments have been (1) to unify the theory for the evolution of genetic systems (recombination and mutation rates) by embedding them in the space of inclusive inheritance, which includes spatial as well as cultural information, and (2) to develop the concept of the variational properties of organisms as phenomena subject to evolutionary dynamics. This includes the discovery of mechanisms that lead to the evolution of evolvability, and modularity in the genotype–phenotype map.

The mathematical inclusiveness of his theoretical work has made it applicable to problems in evolutionary computation. His work on the evolution of biological information transmission has required development of new spectral theorems for linear operators, including a unification of reaction-diffusion theory predicting the evolution of slow dispersal with the Reduction Principle predictions for models of mutation, recombination and migration rate evolution. He has applied spectral theory to understand the evolution of mutational robustness.

Altenberg introduced a number of concepts which have been adopted in several fields:

- introduction of the Price equation into evolutionary computation theory
- mechanisms for the evolution of evolvability and modularity
- the conceptual distinction of generative and variational properties of the genotype–phenotype map
- brood selection in evolutionary algorithms
- generalization of Stuart Kauffman's NK Landscapes, applied to technological evolution
- generalization of the Reduction Principle to infinite dimensional spaces, which unified reaction-diffusion models for the evolution of dispersal, and has been applied to epidemic models.

== Environmental and societal work ==
- A history of Leland Stanford's forgotten advocacy of worker cooperatives
- Light pollution ordinance for Maui, Hawai`i
- Preservation of lowland dry native forest on Maui, Hawai`i
- During the SARS-CoV-2 pandemic he has served with the Hawai`i Pandemic Applied Modeling Workgroup.

== Awards and honors ==
- California delegate to the National Youth Science Camp in 1975
- University of California Regents Scholar 1975–1979
- Elected to Phi Beta Kappa in 1979
- Bachelor of Arts with Distinction in General Scholarship, University of California, Berkeley, 1980
- Stanford University School of Medicine Dean's Postdoctoral Fellow 1985–1986
- Chair of the Native Hawaiian Plant Society on Maui 2005–2007
- Onipa`a Award in 2011, conferred by the Hawai`i Chapter of the Sierra Club, for his work in getting legislation passed to prevent light pollution on Maui, and to preserve an endangered Hawaiian lowland dry forest habitat on Maui in perpetuity.
- Senior Fellow of the Konrad Lorenz Institute for Evolution and Cognition Research 2014–2016
- IEEE Computational Intelligence Society Oral History Project interview in 2017
- Member of the Foundational Questions Institute (FQXi) in 2020

== Professional societies ==
Altenberg is a lifetime member of the:

- International Linear Algebra Society
- Society for Mathematical Biology
