= Variational properties =

In evolutionary biology, the variational properties of an organism are those properties relating to the production of variation among its offspring. In a broader sense variational properties include phenotypic plasticity. Variational properties contrast with functional properties. While the functional properties of an organism determine is level of adaptedness to its environment, it is the variational properties of the organisms in a species that chiefly determine its evolvability and genetic robustness.

Variational properties group together many classical and more recent concepts of evolutionary biology. It includes the classical concepts of pleiotropy, canalization, developmental constraints, developmental bias, morphological integration, developmental homeostasis and later concepts such as robustness, neutral networks, modularity, the G-matrix and distribution of fitness effects.

Variational properties also include the production of DNA sequence variation, epigenetic variation, and phenotypic variation. While the genome is typically thought of as the storehouse of information that generates the organism, it can also be seen as the set of heritable degrees of freedom for varying the organism. DNA thus has both a generative role in the organism, and variational role in the lineage.
