= Evolutionary therapy =

Subfield of evolutionary medicine

Evolutionary therapy is a subfield of evolutionary medicine that utilizes concepts from evolutionary biology in management of diseases caused by evolving entities such as cancer and microbial infections. These evolving disease agents adapt to selective pressure introduced by treatment, allowing them to develop resistance to therapy, making it ineffective.

Evolutionary therapy relies on the notion that Darwinian evolution is the main reason behind lethality of late stage cancer and multi-drug resistant bacterial infections such as methicillin-resistant Staphylococcus aureus. Thus, evolutionary therapy suggests that treatment of such highly dynamic evolving diseases should be changing over time to account for changes in disease populations. Adaptive treatment strategies typically cycle between different drugs or drug doses to take advantage of predictable patterns of disease evolution. This is in contrast to standardized treatment approach which is applied to all patients and equally based on their cancer type and grade. There are still numerous obstacles to the use of evolutionary therapy in clinical practice. These obstacles include high contingency of trajectory, speed of evolution, and inability to track the population state of disease over time.

== Context ==
Resistance to chemotherapy and molecularly targeted therapies is a major problem facing current cancer research. All malignant cancers are fundamentally governed by Darwinian dynamics of the somatic evolution in cancer. Malignant cancers are dynamically evolving clades of cells living in distinct microhabitats that almost certainly ensure the emergence of therapy-resistant populations. Cytotoxic cancer therapies also impose intense evolutionary selection pressures on the surviving cells and thus increase the evolutionary rate. Importantly, the principles of Darwinian dynamics also embody fundamental principles that can illuminate strategies for the successful management of cancer. Eradicating the large, diverse and adaptive populations found in most cancers presents a formidable challenge. One centimetre cubed of cancer contains about 10^9 transformed cells and weighs about 1 gram, which means there are more cancer cells in 10 grams of tumour than there are people on Earth. Unequal cell division and differences in genetic lineages and microenvironmental selection pressures mean that the cells within a tumour are diverse both in genetic make-up and observable characteristics.

== Mechanisms ==
=== Collateral sensitivity ===
Resistance to one drug can lead to unwanted cross-resistance to some other drugs and "collateral" sensitivity to yet other drugs Alternative methods include incorporating analytically tractable stochastic control algorithms to direct the evolution to specific states of resistance that encode sensitivity to other drugs, or machine learning based approaches like reinforcement learning.

== Treatment strategies ==
=== Adaptive therapy ===
The standard approach to treating cancer is giving patients the maximum tolerated amount of chemotherapy with the goal of doing the maximum possible damage to the tumor without killing the patient. This method is relatively effective, but it also causes major toxicities. Adaptive therapy is an evolutionary therapy that aims to maintain or reduce tumor volume by employing minimum effective drug doses or timed drug holidays. The timing and duration of these holidays, which relies on the ability to modulate resistant vs. sensitive populations of cancer cells through competition, is a subject which has been studied using optimal control in theoretical studies based on Evolutionary game theory based models. The ability to modulate these populations secondary relies on the assumption that there is a both frequency-dependent selection, and an associated fitness cost to that resistance.

Proof of principle for adaptive therapy has also been established in a recent phase 2 clinical trial as well as in vivo.

=== Double bind ===
In the evolutionary double bind, one drug causes increased susceptibility of the evolving cancer to another drug. Some have found that effectiveness might be based on interactions of populations through commensalism. Others imply that population control may be possible if resistance to therapy requires a substantial and costly phenotypic adaptation that reduces the organism's fitness.

=== Extinction therapy ===
Extinction therapy is inspired by mass extinction events from the Anthropocene era. This treatment strategy is also sometimes referred to as first strike-second strike, where the first strike reduces the size and heterogeneity of a population so that the second strike that follows can kill the surviving, often fragmented population below a threshold by stochastic perturbations.

== Current state ==
Although there is extensive modeling work on evolutionary therapy, there are only a few completed and ongoing clinical trials that use evolutionary therapy. First one conducted in Moffitt Cancer Center on patients with metastatic castrate-resistant prostate cancer showed outcomes that "show significant improvement over published studies and a contemporaneous population." This study met with some criticism.

== See also ==
- Fitness landscape
- Fitness seascape
- Adaptive dynamics
- Evolutionary game theory
- Genotype-phenotype map
