= Andreas Wagner =

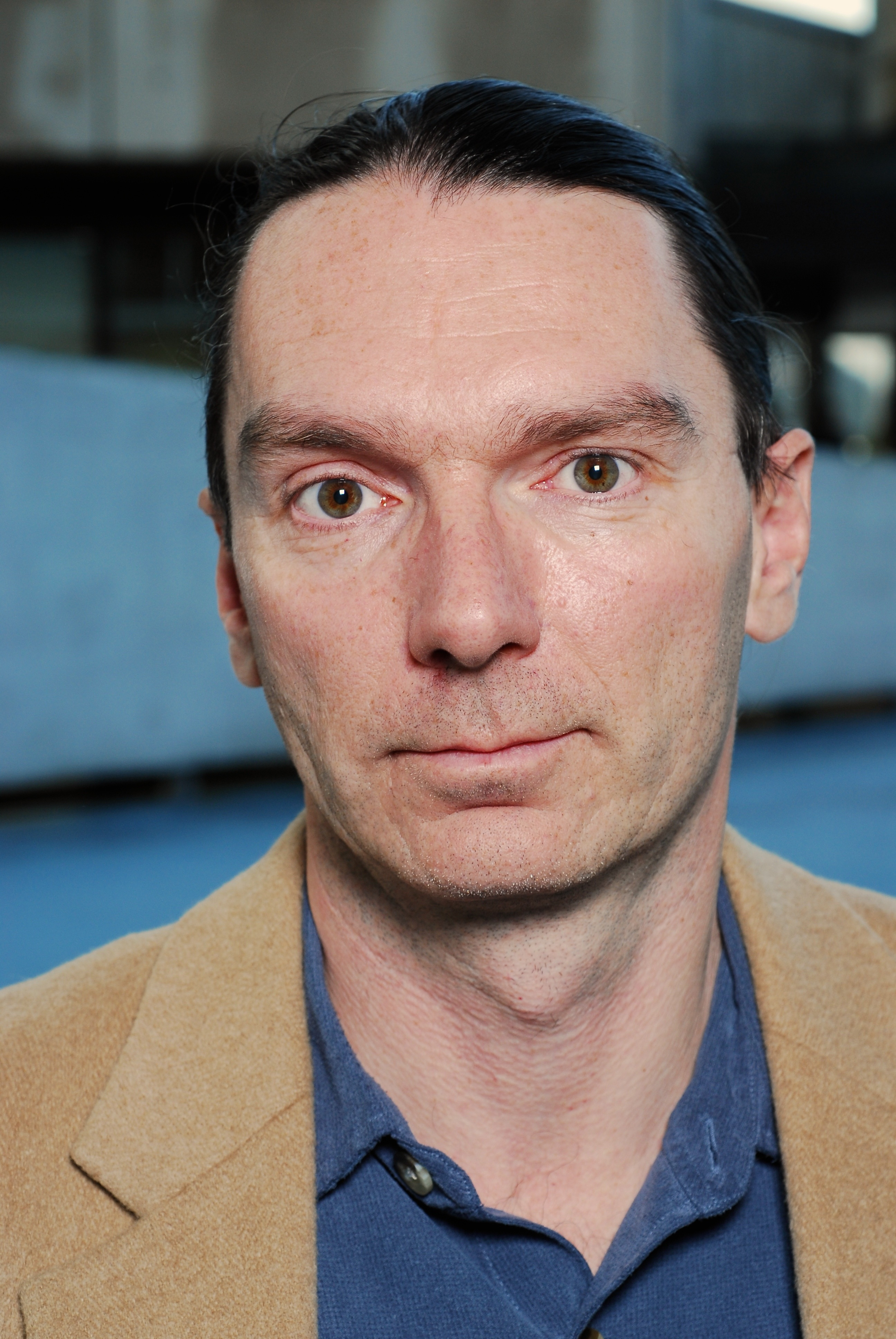
- Born: January 26, 1967 (age 59)
- Known for: Robustness and innovation in the evolution of biological systems
- Awards: Election as AAAS fellow in 2011, election to the EMBO in 2014.
- Scientific career
- Fields: Evolutionary biology
- Workplaces: University of Zürich

Andreas Wagner (born 26 January 1967) is an Austrian/US evolutionary biologist and professor at the University of Zürich, Switzerland. He is known for his work on the role of robustness and innovation in biological evolution. Wagner is professor and chairman at the Department of Evolutionary Biology and Environmental Studies at the University of Zürich.

== Biography ==
Wagner studied biology at the University of Vienna. He received his Ph.D. at Yale University, Department of Biology in 1995. He also holds a M. Phil. from Yale. From 1995 to 1996 he was a fellow at the Institute for Advanced Study Berlin, Germany. From 1998 to 2002 he was assistant professor at the University of New Mexico, Department of Biology and from 2002 to 2012 associate professor (with tenure) at the University of New Mexico, Department of Biology. He was appointed professor at the University of Zürich, Institute of Biochemistry in 2006. In 2011, he joined the Department of Evolutionary Biology and Environmental Studies at the University of Zürich. Since 2016, he is chairman of this department. Since 1999, he is also external professor at the Santa Fe Institute, New Mexico, USA.

== Scientific contribution ==
Wagner's work revolves around the robustness of biological systems, and about their ability to innovate, that is, to create novel organisms and traits that help them survive and reproduce. Robustness is the ability of a biological system to withstand perturbations, such as DNA mutations and environmental change. Early in his career Wagner developed a widely used mathematical model for gene regulatory circuits, (Wagner's gene network model) and used this model to demonstrate that natural selection can increase the robustness of such circuits to DNA mutations. Experimental work in Wagner's Zürich laboratory showed that proteins can evolve robustness to perturbations. One source of robustness to mutations is redundant duplicate genes. Natural selection can maintain their redundancy and the ensuing robustness. However, more important than redundancy, Wagner has argued, is the “distributed robustness” of complex biological systems, which arises from the cooperation of multiple different parts, such as proteins in a regulatory network.

Wagner showed that robustness can accelerate innovation in biological evolution, because it helps organisms tolerate otherwise deleterious mutations that can help create new and useful traits. In this way, robust transcription factor binding sites, for example, can facilitate the evolution of new gene expression. An additional consequence of robustness is that evolving populations of organisms can accumulate cryptic genetic variation, inconsequential variation that may provide benefits in some environments. Wagner's laboratory showed experimentally that such cryptic variation can indeed accelerate the evolution of an RNA enzyme to react with a new substrate molecule. Wagner has argued that robustness can also help resolve the long-standing neutralism-selectionism controversy, which revolves around the question whether frequent neutral mutations – a consequence of robustness – are important for Darwinian evolution. The reason is that neutral mutations are important stepping stones to later evolutionary adaptations and innovations. Robust systems can also bring forth useful traits – potential exaptations – that arise as mere by-products of other, adaptive traits, which can help explain the great abundance of exaptations in life's evolution.

In 2011 Wagner proposed a theory of innovation in which “innovability” – the ability of living systems to create innovations – is a consequence of their robustness, which in turn results from their exposure to ever-changing environments. One central element of the theory are large networks of genotypes with the same phenotypes, which populations of organisms can explore through DNA mutations, and which facilitate the origin of innovations.

Wagner's work has also contributed to long-standing philosophical problems in biology, such as the role of causality and randomness in biological evolution, and to our understanding of the relationship between innovation in human technological and biological evolution, such as the importance of technology standards for innovation.

== Fellowships and awards ==
- 2014 Elected Member, European Molecular Biology Organization (EMBO)
- 2011 Elected Fellow, American Association for the Advancement of Science (AAAS)
- 2010 Gold medal for the book "Paradoxical Life", Independent Publisher Book Award (science category)
- 2010 Silver medal for the book "Paradoxical Life" ForeWord Magazine Book of the Year Award (philosophy category)
- 2004- Member, Faculty of 1000 Biology
- 1996-1998 Postdoctoral Fellowship, The Santa Fe Institute
- 1995-1996 Fellow, Institute for Advanced Study Berlin, Germany
- 1995 J.S. Nicholas Prize for Best Dissertation in Experimental Zoology

== Publications ==
Wagner has published more than 170 articles, a series of book chapters and four books.

Scientific articles

- Andreas Wagner Publication list (University of Zürich: Andreas Wagner Laboratory)

Books

- Wagner, A. (2019) Life Finds a Way: What Evolution Teaches Us About Creativity. Basic Books. ISBN 978-1541645332
- Wagner, A. (2014) The Arrival of the Fittest: How Nature Innovates. Penguin Random House. ISBN 978-1-59184-646-8 hbk; Wagner, Andreas (6 October 2015). 2015 pbk edition. ISBN 978-1-61723-021-9.
- Wagner, A. (2011) The Origins of Evolutionary Innovations. Oxford University Press. ISBN 978-0-19-969260-6 pbk
- Wagner, A. (2009) Paradoxical Life. Yale University Press. ISBN 9780300171525
- Wagner, A. (2005) Robustness and Evolvability in Living Systems. Princeton University Press. ISBN 0691122407
  - Wagner, Andreas (2013). third printing of 2007 pbk edition. ISBN 978-0-691-13404-8.
  - Wagner, Andreas (24 October 2013). 2013 Kindle Edition. ISBN 9781400849383.
