= Sohini Ramachandran =

Computational biology professor

- Education: Stanford University
- Scientific career
- Thesis: The signature of historical migrations on human population genetic data (2007)
- Doctoral advisor: Marcus Feldman
- Website: https://brown.edu/Research/Ramachandran_Lab/

Sohini Ramachandran is professor at Brown University known for her work in evolutionary biology and population genetics.

== Early life and education ==
Ramachandran's parents were both professors. In the summer before her senior year of high school, Ramachandran completed a research project in plant genomics under the guidance of Marcus Feldman, which won her the fourth place prize in the 1998 Westinghouse Science Talent Search, where when she was the youngest finalist in the group. Ramachandran earned a B.S. from Stanford University in 2002. She went on to complete a Ph.D. at Stanford University in the Department of Biological Sciences, advised by Marcus Feldman. Her dissertation research was dissertation was titled "The signature of historical migrations on human population genetic data." Following her PhD, she was in the Harvard Society of Fellows as a postdoctoral researcher with John Wakeley in Harvard University's Department of Organismic and Evolutionary Biology. She moved to Brown University in 2010 and was promoted to professor in 2021. In 2019, she was a fellow at the Swedish Collegium for Advanced Study.

== Research ==
Ramachandran's research group uses statistical and mathematical modeling techniques to study evolutionary biology and population genetics. Her early research examined the genetic relationships originating within people from Africa, where she showed that diversity decreases as distance from Africa increases. She has also investigated the use of genetic tools to track infectious diseases and shown that while more outbreaks are occurring, fewer people are getting infected. She has also shown a lack of genetic evidence for selection for language at the FOXP2 site.

== Selected publications ==
- Li, Jun Z.; Absher, Devin M.; Tang, Hua; Southwick, Audrey M.; Casto, Amanda M.; Ramachandran, Sohini; Cann, Howard M.; Barsh, Gregory S.; Feldman, Marcus; Cavalli-Sforza, Luigi L.; Myers, Richard M. (2008-02-22). "Worldwide Human Relationships Inferred from Genome-Wide Patterns of Variation". Science. 319 (5866): 1100–1104. Bibcode:2008Sci...319.1100L. doi:10.1126/science.1153717. ISSN 0036-8075. PMID 18292342. S2CID 53541133.
- Ramachandran, Sohini; Deshpande, Omkar; Roseman, Charles C.; Rosenberg, Noah A.; Feldman, Marcus W.; Cavalli-Sforza, L. Luca (2005). "Support from the relationship of genetic and geographic distance in human populations for a serial founder effect originating in Africa". Proceedings of the National Academy of Sciences. 102 (44): 15942–15947. Bibcode:2005PNAS..10215942R. doi:10.1073/pnas.0507611102. ISSN 0027-8424. PMC 1276087. PMID 16243969.
- Wang, Sijia; Lewis, Cecil M. Jr.; Jakobsson, Mattias; Ramachandran, Sohini; Ray, Nicolas; Bedoya, Gabriel; Rojas, Winston; Parra, Maria V.; Molina, Julio A.; Gallo, Carla; Mazzotti, Guido (2007-11-23). "Genetic Variation and Population Structure in Native Americans". PLOS Genetics. 3 (11) e185. doi:10.1371/journal.pgen.0030185. ISSN 1553-7404. PMC 2082466. PMID 18039031.
- Ramachandran, Sohini; Rosenberg, Noah A.; Zhivotovsky, Lev A.; Feldman, Marcus W. (2004). "Robustness of the inference of human population structure: A comparison of X-chromosomal and autosomal microsatellites". Human Genomics. 1 (2): 87–97. doi:10.1186/1479-7364-1-2-87. ISSN 1479-7364. PMC 3525066. PMID 15601537.

== Honors and awards ==
In 2012, Ramachandran received a Sloan Research Fellowship and was named a Pew Scholar. From Brown University she has received the Henry Merritt Wriston Fellowship (2016) and the Philip J. Bray Award for excellence in teaching. In 2019, she received a Presidential Early Career Award in Science and Engineering.
