= NYSC =

NYSC may refer to:

- National Youth Science Camp, an annual science education camp in the US state of West Virginia
- National Youth Service Corps, a Nigerian national service program for college graduates
- New York Supreme Court, the highest trial-level court in the US state of New York
- NYSC (New York Sports Club), a local brand name of Town Sports International Holdings
