= Noah Rosenberg =

American geneticist

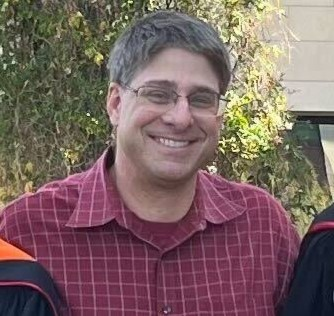
- Born: Noah Aubrey Rosenberg
- Education: Rice University
- Spouse: Donna Zulman
- Awards: Fellow of the American Association for the Advancement of Science
- Scientific career
- Fields: Population genetics Phylogenetics; Mathematical and theoretical biology
- Thesis: Statistical modeling of genetic histories and relationships of populations (2001)
- Doctoral advisor: Marcus Feldman
- Website: rosenberglab.stanford.edu

Noah Aubrey Rosenberg is an American geneticist specializing in evolutionary biology, mathematical phylogenetics, and population genetics at Stanford University in the Department of Biology, where he holds the Stanford Professorship in Population Genetics and Society. His research focuses on mathematical modeling and statistical methods for genetics and evolution and he is the editor-in-chief of Theoretical Population Biology.

== Education ==
Rosenberg graduated from the Illinois Mathematics and Science Academy in 1993, where he began the mathematical reference known as The Noah Sheets. He earned a BA in mathematics from Rice University in 1997, where he scored among the top 100 students in the Putnam Competition. Rosenberg earned an MS in mathematics from Stanford University in 1999 and a PhD in biology from Stanford University in 2001 under the supervision of Marcus Feldman. His dissertation was titled "Statistical modeling of genetic histories and relationships of populations." Part of his dissertation work was recognized as The Lancet's 2003 paper of the year. From 2001 to 2005, Rosenberg was a postdoctoral fellow at the University of Southern California.

== Career ==
Rosenberg was a professor at the University of Michigan from 2005 to 2011, where he held appointments in the Department of Human Genetics, the Department of Ecology and Evolutionary Biology, and the Department of Biostatistics. He joined the Stanford University Department of Biology as an associate professor in 2011 and was promoted to full professor in 2014, when he was named the Stanford Professor of Population Genetics and Society. He is a member of Stanford's Institute for Computational and Mathematical Engineering (ICME) and Stanford Bio-X. Rosenberg was elected as a fellow of the American Association for the Advancement of Science in 2018.

Rosenberg has published more than 150 peer-reviewed articles and has advised more than 35 doctoral students and postdoctoral fellows. His trainees have gone on to professorships at universities including Cornell University, Duke University, the MD Anderson Cancer Center, and the University of Southern California.

Rosenberg has served as the editor-in-chief of the journal Theoretical Population Biology since 2013 and has served as an associate editor for scientific journals including Genetics and Evolution, Medicine, and Public Health. He is also a co-director of the Stanford Center for Computational, Evolutionary, and Human Genomics. In 2018, Rosenberg started the Stanford X-Tree Project, a website illustrating concepts from phylogenetics using photographs of real trees from the Stanford campus.

== Research ==
Much of Rosenberg's work has analyzed global patterns of genetic and linguistic variation, including developing software for the analysis and visualization of population ancestry data. He has also studied the genetic histories of specific people groups, such as the Ohlone Indigenous population of California, African Americans, and Jewish populations.

Rosenberg's work in forensic genetics has explored the implications of imputation techniques for genetic privacy. His work in coalescent theory has characterized the effects of consanguinity, founder events, and migration on patterns of genetic variation. And his work in human genetics has investigated the implications of population history for association studies and polygenic scores.

Rosenberg has contributed to the understanding of mathematical properties of objects and quantities used in evolutionary biology. His work includes combinatorial enumeration of phylogenetic trees and coalescent histories, analysis of evolutionary models, and derivation of mathematical bounds on population-genetic statistics. He has also applied population-genetic statistics to other fields, such as his 2020 paper bridging health care efficiency research and population-genetic statistics which he co-authored with his wife, Donna Zulman.

Rosenberg is a regular contributor to the On-Line Encyclopedia of Integer Sequences.
