= Julie A. Robinson (biologist) =

American scientist

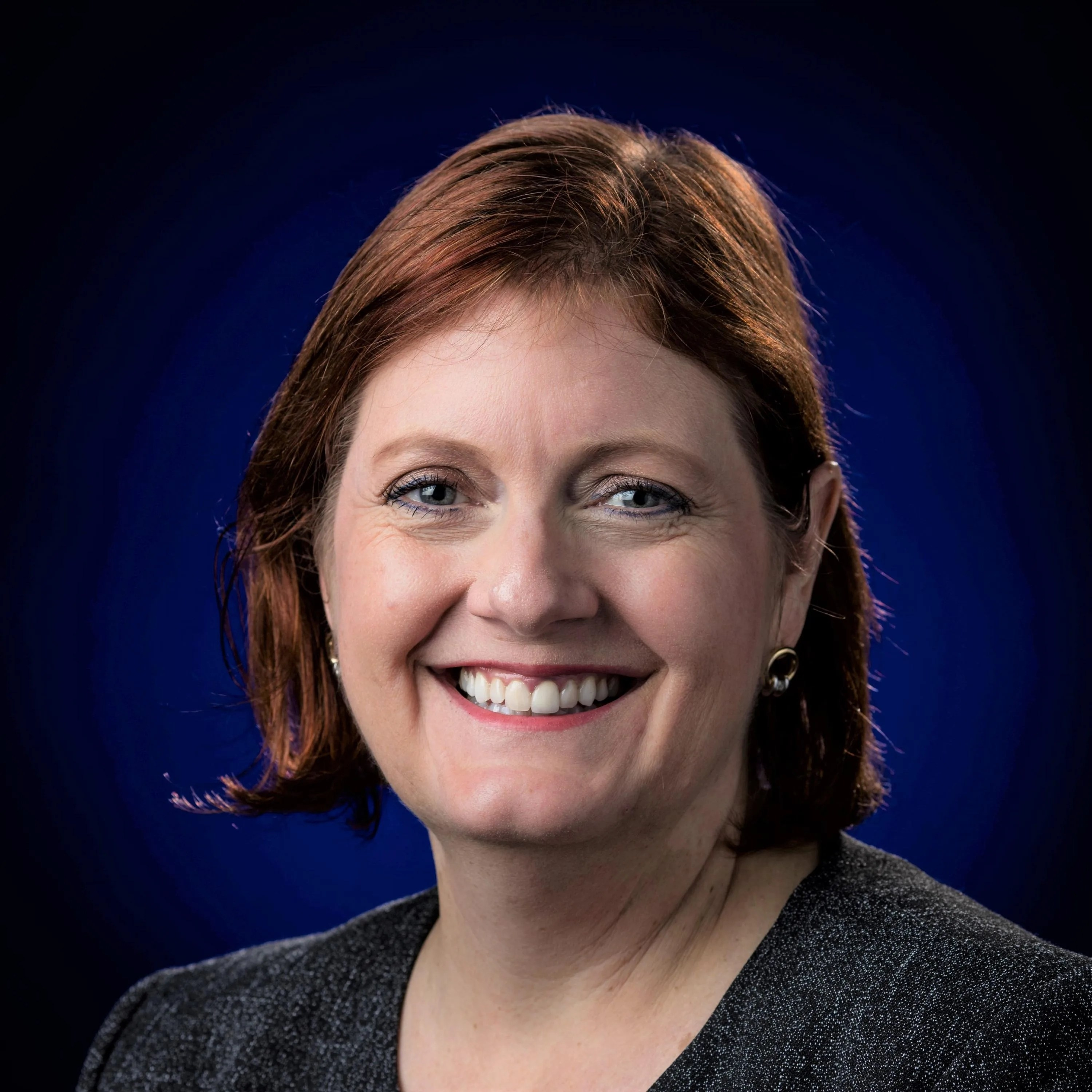
Julie A. Robinson

Julie Ann Robinson is the Deputy Director for Earth Sciences at NASA and was previously Chief Scientist for Human Exploration and Operations, and earlier Chief Scientist for the International Space Station Program for over twelve years. Her background is in both the physical and biological sciences.

== Early life and education ==
In 1985, Julie A. Robinson graduated from Highland High school in Pocatello, Idaho, and was selected as one of two Idaho representatives to the Presidential Scholars Program and as an Idaho delegate to the National Youth Science Camp. She did not think that she was going to be able to attend college due to financial difficulties, until she received word from Utah State that they had awarded her their Presidential Scholarship that covered full tuition for four years. Julie A. Robinson graduated from Utah State University in 1989 with a Bachelor of Science in Chemistry and a Bachelor of Science in Biology. She later went on to study at the University of Nevada, Reno where she was supported by an NSF Graduate Research Fellowship. She obtained a doctoral degree in Ecology, Evolution, and Conservation Biology in 1996, and was named Regent's Outstanding Graduate Student.

== Career ==
She went on to do postdoctoral research in Texas at the University of Houston. At the University of Houston she created maps indicating how different species responded to hurricanes. She then went on to work with Lockheed Martin in the Image Science Laboratory at Houston’s Johnson Space Center, training astronauts for Space Station Mir, the Space Shuttle, and the International Space Station. While working at Lockheed Martin, she led a NASA sponsored project to develop the mapping of coral reefs all around the globe. She was an author with Cynthia A. Evans of a paper on spatial resolution of photographic remote sensing data which was the first peer-reviewed publication featuring data collected from the International Space Station.

In 2004, she started working at NASA as a science representative for the International Space Station. In 2006 she became a deputy program scientist, and served as ISS chief scientist from 2007-2019. She oversaw the laboratory from the assembly period to full utilization with hundreds of experiments and scientists active at any given time. She oversaw the expansion of ISS research to include Earth science and astrophysics instruments, the use of the ISS National Lab by other government agencies, industry, and nonprofit organizations, and international collaboration and effective use of ISS by scientists from four ISS international partner agencies and over 100 countries. She founded and served as the executive editor of the first two editions of the International Space Station Benefits for Humanity series, and spoke broadly about the variety of unique scientific results with the media.

She received the NASA Outstanding Leadership Medal in 2011. She was named National Youth Science Camp Alumna of the Year in 2017. In a commencement address at the University of Nevada, Reno College of Science and College of Engineering graduation ceremony in 2019, Robinson called for each graduate to “make a lifetime commitment to public communication—to ensure that your knowledge is available to everyone, that science is part of our public discourse.” She also received an honorary Doctor of Science degree from Utah State University in 2021.

== Personal life ==
Her hobbies include drawing, painting, singing jazz, and classical music.
