= Wagner's gene network model =

Wagner's gene network model is a computational model of artificial gene networks, which explicitly modeled the developmental and evolutionary process of genetic regulatory networks. A population with multiple organisms can be created and evolved from generation to generation. It was first developed by Andreas Wagner in 1996 and has been investigated by other groups to study the evolution of gene networks, gene expression, robustness, plasticity and epistasis.

== Assumptions ==
The model and its variants have a number of simplifying assumptions. Three of them are listing below.

1. The organisms are modeled as gene regulatory networks. The models assume that gene expression is regulated exclusively at the transcriptional level;
2. The product of a gene can regulate the expression of (be a regulator of) that source gene or other genes. The models assume that a gene can only produce one active transcriptional regulator;
3. The effects of one regulator are independent of effects of other regulators on the same target gene.

== Genotype ==
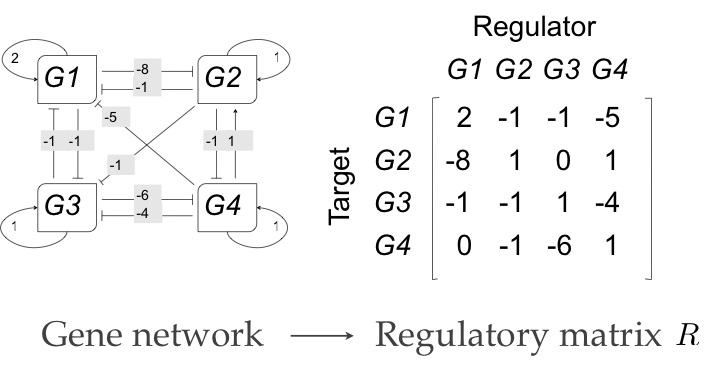
Network representation of the regulatory interactions between four genes (G1, G2, G3 and G4). Activations and repressions are denoted by arrows and bars, respectively. Numbers indicate the relative interaction strengths. Interaction matrix $R$ on the right representing the network on the left.

The model represents individuals as networks of interacting transcriptional regulators. Each individual expresses $n$ genes encoding transcription factors. The product of each gene can regulate the expression level of itself and/or the other genes through cis-regulatory elements. The interactions among genes constitute a gene network that is represented by a $N$ × $N$ regulatory matrix $(R)$ in the model. The elements in matrix R represent the interaction strength. Positive values within the matrix represent the activation of the target gene, while negative ones represent repression. Matrix elements with value 0 indicate the absence of interactions between two genes.

== Phenotype ==
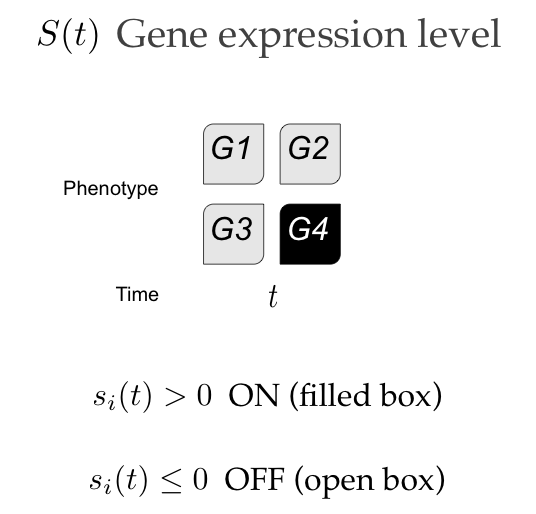
An example of how the gene expression pattern modeled in Wagner model and its variants. G1, G2, G3 and G4 represent genes in the network. Filled box means the gene expression of that particular gene is on; open box means off. Gene expression patterns are represented by the state vector $S$ whose elements $s_i(t)$ describe the expression states of gene $i$.

The phenotype of each individual is modeled as the gene expression pattern at time $t$. It is represented by a state vector $S(t)$ in this model.

$S(t)\ :=\ (s_1(t),\ . . .,\ s_N(t))$

whose element $s_i(t)$ denotes the expression state of gene i at time t. In the original Wagner model,

$s_i(t)$ ∈ $\{-1,1\}$

where 1 represents the gene is expressed while -1 implies the gene is not expressed. The expression pattern can only be ON or OFF. The continuous expression pattern between -1 (or 0) and 1 is also implemented in some other variants.

== Development ==
The development process is modeled as the development of gene expression states. The gene expression pattern $S(0)$ at time $t=0$ is defined as the initial expression state. The interactions among genes change the expression states during the development process. This process is modeled by the following differential equations

$S_l(t+\tau) = \sigma[\sum_{j=1}^N w_{ij} S_j(t)] = \sigma[h_i](t),$

where $S_l(t+$τ) represents the expression state of $G_l$ at time $t+\tau$. It is determined by a filter function σ$(x)$. $h_i(t)$ represents the weighted sum of regulatory effects ($w_{ij}$) of all genes on gene $G_i$ at time $t$. In the original Wagner model, the filter function is a step function

$$\sigma(x) = \begin{cases} -1, & (x<0) \\ 1, & (x>0) \\ 0, & (x=0). \end{cases}$$

In other variants, the filter function is implemented as a sigmoidal function

$\sigma(x)=\frac{2}{1+e^{-ax}}-1$

In this way, the expression states will acquire a continuous distribution. The gene expression will reach the final state if it reaches a stable pattern.

== Evolution ==
Evolutionary simulations are performed by reproduction-mutation-selection life cycle. Populations are fixed at size $N$ and they will not go extinct. Non-overlapping generations are employed. In a typical evolutionary simulation, a single random viable individual that can produce a stable gene expression pattern is chosen as the founder. Cloned individuals are generated to create a population of $N$ identical individuals. According to the asexual or sexual reproductive mode, offspring are produced by randomly choosing (with replacement) parent individual(s) from current generation. Mutations can be acquired with probability μ and survive with probability equal to their fitness. This process is repeated until N individuals are produced that go on to found the following generation.

== Fitness ==
Fitness in this model is the probability that an individual survives to reproduce. In the simplest implementation of the model, developmentally stable genotypes survive (i.e. their fitness is $1$) and developmentally unstable ones do not (i.e. their fitness is $0$).

== Mutation ==
Mutations are modeled as the changes in gene regulation, i.e., the changes of the elements in the regulatory matrix $R$.

== Reproduction ==
Both sexual and asexual reproductions are implemented. Asexual reproduction is implemented as producing the offspring's genome (the gene network) by directly copying the parent's genome. Sexual reproduction is implemented as the recombination of the two parents' genomes.

== Selection ==
An organism is considered viable if it reaches a stable gene expression pattern. An organism with oscillated expression pattern is discarded and cannot enter the next generation.
