= Evolutionary capacitance =

Evolutionary biology hypothesis

Evolutionary capacitance is the storage and release of variation, just as electrical capacitors store and release charge. Living systems are robust to mutations. This means that living systems accumulate genetic variation without the variation having a phenotypic effect. But when the system is disturbed (perhaps by stress), robustness breaks down, and the variation has phenotypic effects and is subject to the full force of natural selection. An evolutionary capacitor is a molecular switch mechanism that can "toggle" genetic variation between hidden and revealed states. If some subset of newly revealed variation is adaptive, it becomes fixed by genetic assimilation. After that, the rest of variation, most of which is presumably deleterious, can be switched off, leaving the population with a newly evolved advantageous trait, but no long-term handicap. For evolutionary capacitance to increase evolvability in this way, the switching rate should not be faster than the timescale of genetic assimilation.

This mechanism would allow for rapid adaptation to new environmental conditions. Switching rates may be a function of stress, making genetic variation more likely to affect the phenotype at times when it is most likely to be useful for adaptation. In addition, strongly deleterious variation may be purged while in a partially cryptic state, so cryptic variation that remains is more likely to be adaptive than random mutations are. Capacitance can help cross "valleys" in the fitness landscape, where a combination of two mutations would be beneficial, even though each is deleterious on its own.

There is currently no consensus about the extent to which capacitance might contribute to evolution in natural populations. The possibility of evolutionary capacitance is considered to be part of the extended evolutionary synthesis.

Switches that turn robustness to phenotypic rather than genetic variation on and off do not fit the capacitance analogy, as their presence does not cause variation to accumulate over time. They have instead been called phenotypic stabilizers.

== Enzyme promiscuity ==
In addition to their native reaction, many enzymes perform side reactions. Similarly, binding proteins may spend some proportion of their time bound to off-target proteins. These reactions or interactions may be of no consequence to current fitness but under altered conditions, may provide the starting point for adaptive evolution. For example, several mutations in the antibiotic resistance gene B-lactamase introduce cefotaxime resistance but do not affect ampicillin resistance. In populations exposed only to ampicillin, such mutations may be present in a minority of members since there is not fitness cost (i.e. are within the neutral network). This represents cryptic genetic variation since if the population is newly exposed to cefotaxime, the minority members will exhibit some resistance.

== Chaperones ==
Chaperones assist in protein folding. The need to fold proteins correctly is a big restriction on the evolution of protein sequences. It has been proposed that the presence of chaperones may, by providing additional robustness to errors in folding, allow the exploration of a larger set of genotypes. When chaperones are overworked at times of environmental stress, this may "switch on" previously cryptic genetic variation.

=== Hsp90 ===
The hypothesis that chaperones can act as evolutionary capacitors is closely associated with the heat shock protein Hsp90. When Hsp90 is downregulated in the fruit fly Drosophila melanogaster, a broad range of different phenotypes are seen, where the identity of the phenotype depends on the genetic background. Also, a recent study on the model insect, the red flour beetle Tribolium castaneum, showed that Hsp90 impairment revealed a new phenotype, reduced-eye phenotype, which was stably inherited without further HSP90 inhibition (https://doi.org/10.1101/690727). This was thought to prove that the new phenotypes depended on pre-existing cryptic genetic variation that had merely been revealed. More recent evidence suggests that these data might be explained by new mutations caused by the reactivation of formally dormant transposable elements. However, this finding regarding transposable elements may be dependent on the strong nature of the Hsp90 knockdown used in that experiment.

=== GroEL ===
The overproduction of GroEL in Escherichia coli increases mutational robustness. This can increase evolvability.

== Yeast prion [PSI+] ==
Sup35p is a yeast protein involved in recognising stop codons and causing translation to stop correctly at the ends of proteins. Sup35p comes in a normal form ([psi-]) and a prion form ([PSI+]). When [PSI+] is present, this depletes the amount of normal Sup35p available. As a result, the rate of errors in which translation continues beyond a stop codon increases from about 0.3% to about 1%.

This can lead to different growth rates, and sometimes different morphologies, in matched [PSI+] and [psi-] strains in a variety of stressful environments. Sometimes the [PSI+] strain grows faster, sometimes [psi-]: this depends on the genetic background of the strain, suggesting that [PSI+] taps into pre-existing cryptic genetic variation. Mathematical models suggest that [PSI+] may have evolved, as an evolutionary capacitor, to promote evolvability.

[PSI+] appears more frequently in response to environmental stress. In yeast, more stop codon disappearances are in-frame, mimicking the effects of [PSI+], than would be expected from mutation bias or than are observed in other taxa that do not form the [PSI+] prion. These observations are compatible with [PSI+] acting as an evolutionary capacitor in the wild.

Similar transient increases in error rates can evolve emergently in the absence of a "widget" like [PSI+]. The primary advantage of a [PSI+]-like widget is to facilitate the subsequent evolution of lower error rates once genetic assimilation has occurred.

== Gene knockouts ==
Gene knockouts can be used to identify novel genes or genomic regions which function as evolutionary capacitors. When a gene is knocked out, and its removal reveals phenotypic variation that was not previously observable, that gene is functioning as a phenotypic capacitor. If any of the variation is adaptive, it is functioning as an evolutionary capacitor.

=== Fruit Flies ===
Deficiency in at least 15 different genes reveals cryptic variation in wing morphology in Drosophila melanogaster. While some of the variation revealed by these knockouts is deleterious, other variation has a relatively minor effect on aerodynamics, and could even improve the flight capability of an individual.

=== Yeast ===
In yeast, the knockout of certain chromatin regulating genes increases the differences in expression between yeast species. The majority of the variation in protein expression is attributable to trans effects, suggesting that trans-regulatory processes are strongly involved in canalization. Unlike the chromatin regulators, the removal of genes which code for metabolic enzymes does not have a consistent effect on the difference in expression between species, with different enzyme knockouts either increasing, decreasing, or not significantly affecting the expression difference.

Broader knockout samples in yeast have identified at least 300 genes which, when absent, increase morphological variation between yeast individuals. These capacitor genes predominantly occupy a few key domains in gene ontology, including chromosome organization and DNA integrity, RNA elongation, protein modification, cell cycle, and response to stimuli such as stress. More generally, capacitor genes are likely to express proteins which act as network hubs in the interactome of a cell, and in the network of synthetic-lethal interactions. The confidence that a specific gene acts as a phenotypic capacitor is correlated with the number of protein-protein interactions observed for its expressed protein. However, proteins with the highest amount of interactions have reduced phenotypic capacitance, possibly due to increased duplication of regions coding these proteins in the genome, reducing the effect of a single knockout.

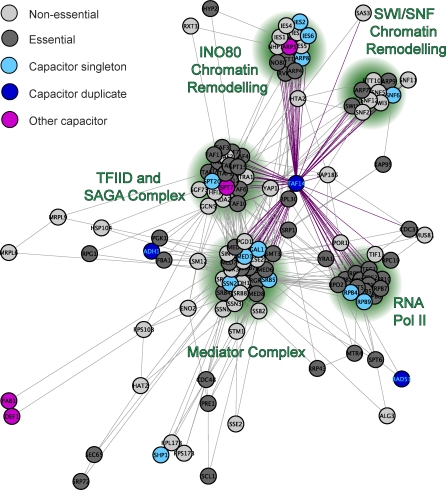
Singleton capacitors (light blue) are generally part of large complexes, while duplicate capacitors (dark blue) often interact with several major complexes.

Capacitor genes are less likely to have paralogs elsewhere in the genome; most capacitors identified in yeast are either singleton genes, or have historical paralogs from which they have diverged substantially in terms of expression. Singleton and duplicate capacitors largely exhibit disjoint behavior in the interactome. Singleton capacitors are most often part of highly interconnected complexes (such as the mediator complex), while duplicate capacitors are more highly connected and tend to interact with multiple large complexes. The gene ontologies of singleton and duplicate capacitors also differ notably. Singleton capacitors are concentrated in the categories of DNA maintenance and organization, response to stimuli, and RNA transcription and localization, whereas duplicate capacitors are concentrated in the categories of protein metabolism and endocytosis.

=== Redundancy ===
The mechanism of phenotypic capacitor genes in yeast appears to be closely related to the modalities of functional redundancy at various levels of the genome. Coding regions that are necessary for the synthesis of key proteins which do not have paralogs elsewhere in the genome are lethal when removed. Conversely, coding regions with many paralogs or strongly expressed paralogs have a minimal effect on overall expression (especially trans regulatory expression) when removed. Singleton and duplicate capacitors both largely represent instances of incomplete functional redundancy; differentially expressed paralogs of duplicate capacitors continue some functionality of the original gene, and the protein-protein interaction complexes within which singleton capacitors reside largely exhibit overlapping functionality. In general the phenotypic capacitors identified by knockouts in yeast are genes expressed in several key regulatory areas which, while non-lethal when removed, do not have enough redundancy to maintain complete functionality. The concept of functional redundancy may also be involved in the high number of synthetic-lethal interactions which capacitor genes participate in. When a gene has its functionality resumed by a paralog or functional analog, its removal is not inherently lethal, however when the gene and its redundancy are removed, the result is lethality.

=== Simulations ===
Computational simulations of knockouts in complex gene interaction networks have demonstrated that many, and possibly all expressed genes have the potential to reveal phenotypic variation of some kind when removed, and that previously identified capacitor genes are simply especially strong examples. Capacitance, then, is simply a feature of complex gene networks that arises in conjunction with canalization.

== Facultative sex ==
Recessive mutations can be thought of as cryptic when they are present overwhelmingly in heterozygotes rather than homozygotes. Facultative sex that takes the form of selfing can act as an evolutionary capacitor in a primarily asexual population by creating homozygotes. Facultative sex that takes the form of outcrossing can act as an evolutionary capacitor by breaking up allele combinations with phenotypic effects that normally cancel out.

== See also ==
- Canalization (genetics)
- Epigenetics
- Preadaptation
- Susan Lindquist
