= Cross-resistance =

Chemicals stop working at the same time

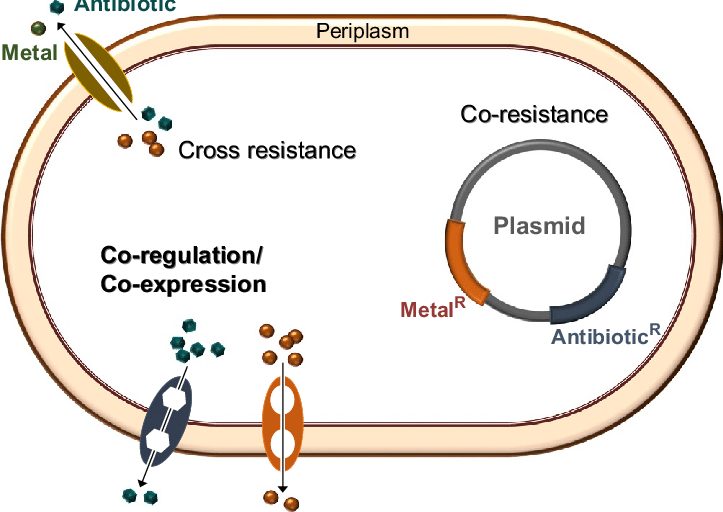

Cross-resistance is when something develops resistance to several substances that have a similar mechanism of action. For example, if a certain type of bacteria develops antimicrobial resistance to one antibiotic, that bacteria will also have resistance to several other antibiotics that target the same protein or use the same route to get into the bacterium. A real example of cross-resistance occurred for nalidixic acid and ciprofloxacin, which are both quinolone antibiotics. When bacteria developed resistance to ciprofloxacin, they also developed resistance to nalidixic acid because both drugs inhibit topoisomerase, a key enzyme in DNA replication. Due to cross-resistance, antimicrobial treatments like phage therapy can quickly lose their efficacy against bacteria. This makes cross-resistance an important consideration in designing evolutionary therapies.

== Definition ==
Cross-resistance is the idea is that the development of resistance to one substance subsequently leads to resistance to one or more substances that can be resisted in a similar manner. It occurs when resistance is provided against multiple compounds through one single mechanism, like an efflux pump. This can keep concentrations of a toxic substance at low levels and can do so for multiple compounds. Increasing the activity of such a mechanism in response to one compound then also has a similar effect on the others. The precise definition of cross-resistance depends on the field of interest.

=== Pest management ===
In pest management, cross-resistance is defined as the development of resistance by pest populations to multiple pesticides within a chemical family. Similar to the case of microbes, this may occur due to sharing binding target sites. For example, cadherin mutations may result in cross resistance in H. armigera to Cry1Aa and Cry1Ab. There also exists multiple resistance in which resistance to multiple pesticides occurs via different resistance mechanisms as opposed to the same mechanisms.

=== Microorganisms ===
In another case it is defined as the resistance of a virus to a new drug as a result of previous exposure to another drug. Or in the context of microbes, it is the resistance to multiple different antimicrobial agents as a result of a single molecular mechanism.

== Antibiotic resistance ==
Cross-resistance is highly involved in the widespread issue of antibiotic resistance; an area of clinical relevance. There is a continued increase in the development of multidrug resistance in bacteria. This is partially due to the widespread use of antimicrobial compounds in diverse environments. But resistance to antibiotics can arise in multiple ways, not necessarily being the result of exposure to an antimicrobial compound.

=== Structural similarity ===
Cross-resistance can take place between compounds that are chemically similar, like antibiotics within similar and different classes. That said, structural similarity is a weak predictor of antibiotic resistance, and does not predict antibiotic resistance at all when aminoglycosides are disregarded in the comparison.

=== Target similarity ===
Cross resistance will most commonly occur due to target similarity. This is possible when antimicrobial agents have the same target, initiate cell death in a similar manner or have a similar route of access. An example is cross-resistance between antibiotics and disinfectants. Exposure to certain disinfectants can lead to the increased expression of genes that encode for efflux pumps that are able to maintain low levels of antibiotics. Thus, the same mechanism that is used to clear the disinfectant compound from the cell can also be used to clear antibiotics from the cell. Another example is cross-resistance between antibiotics and metals. As mentioned before, compounds do not have to be similar in structure in order to lead to cross-resistance. It can also occur when the same mechanism is used to remove the compound from the cell. In the bacteria Listeria monocytogenes a multi-drug efflux transporter has been found that could export both metals and antibiotics. Experimental work has shown that exposure to zinc can lead to increased levels of bacterial resistance to antibiotics. Several other studies have reported cross-resistance to various types of metals and antibiotics. These worked through several mechanisms, like drug efflux systems and disulphide bond formation systems. The possible implication of this is that not only the presence of antibacterial compounds can lead to the development of resistance against antibiotics, but also environmental factors like exposure to heavy metals.

== Collateral sensitivity ==
Collateral sensitivity is a phenomenon where resistance to a drug leads to increased susceptibility to another drug. This concept has been studied in both bacteria and in pathogenic fungi Researchers have discovered that collateral sensitivity-based treatments are effective against resistant populations in vitro, which is promising regarding the effort to combat the harms created by cross resistance to commonly used antibiotics. Increased sensitivity to an antibiotic means that a lower concentration of antibiotic can be used to achieve adequate growth inhibition.

While the individual mechanisms for collateral sensitivity are not yet well-understood, it is thought that collateral sensitivity and antimicrobial resistance exist as a trade-off in which the benefits gained by antibiotic resistance are balanced by the risks introduced by collateral sensitivity. A specific mechanism of antimicrobial resistance may reduce the organism's fitness, and therefore expose or increase its vulnerability to a different class of drug. As more research is conducted in this area collateral sensitivity based treatments could be utilised for known multidrug resistant pathogens, such as methicillin resistant Staphylococcus aureus, Candida auris and Candida albicans.

== See also ==
- Drug resistance
- Pesticide resistance
