= Fitness seascape =

Model of evolution under time-varying selection

A fitness seascape is an extension of the classical fitness-landscape framework in evolutionary biology in which the mapping between genotype and fitness changes over time or across environments. Unlike static landscapes, fitness seascapes describe adaptive surfaces whose peaks and valleys shift as selection pressures vary, producing time-dependent evolutionary trajectories.

Fitness seascapes have been used to study evolution under fluctuating ecological and pharmacologic conditions, including drug cycling, immune-driven selection, and changing environmental stress. Experimental and theoretical work has shown that explicitly modeling time-varying selection can improve prediction of adaptive outcomes in microbial and cancer systems.

The seascape framework has also been formalized mathematically in statistical-physics models that analyze adaptive flux, peak movement, and non-equilibrium dynamics in evolving populations.

== See also ==
- Fitness landscape
- Adaptive dynamics
- Evolutionary game theory
- Genotype-phenotype map
