= Marcus Feldman =

Australian-American evolutionary biologist

- Born: Marcus William Feldman; 14 November 1942 (age 83); Perth, Australia
- Citizenship: American (naturalised 1994)
- Education: Monash University (MSc); Stanford University (PhD)
- Awards: Dan David Prize; Guggenheim Fellowship; Motoo Kimura Award; Member of the National Academy of Sciences
- Scientific career
- Fields: Mathematics; Evolutionary biology; Population genetics
- Workplaces: La Trobe University; Stanford University
- Thesis: Some Topics in Theoretical Population Genetics (1969)
- Doctoral advisor: Samuel Karlin; Walter Bodmer
- Doctoral students: Lee Altenberg; Carl Bergstrom; Andy Clark; Kent Holsinger; Marcy Uyenoyama; Lauren Meyers; Magnus Nordborg; Sarah Otto; Julie Granka; Kaleda Denton; Hao Shen; Jonathan K. Pritchard; David B. Goldstein; Noah Rosenberg
- Website: www-evo.stanford.edu; profiles.stanford.edu/marcus-feldman

Marcus William Feldman (born 14 November 1942) is the Burnet C. and Mildred Finley Wohlford Professor of Biological Sciences, director of the Morrison Institute for Population and Resource Studies, and co-director of the Center for Computational, Evolutionary and Human Genomics (CEHG) at Stanford University. He is an Australian-born mathematician turned American theoretical biologist, best known for his mathematical evolutionary theory and computational studies in evolutionary biology, and for originating with L. L. Cavalli-Sforza the theory of cultural evolution.

== Early life and education ==
Marcus Feldman was born and raised in Perth, Australia. His father Simon Feldman was an engineer, and this inspired him to take up mathematics. He studied at the University of Western Australia from where he matriculated in 1959, and graduated (with majors in mathematics and statistics) in 1964. In 1966 he obtained Master of Science degree in mathematics from Monash University. He went abroad to US to join a PhD programme at Stanford University. He earned his degree in 1969 under the supervision of Samuel Karlin in the Department of Mathematics.

== Professional career ==
After a brief work at Stanford as a research assistant for Karlin, and as acting assistant professor in the Department of Biology, Feldman returned to Australia to join at La Trobe University as a lecturer of mathematics. In 1971 he was appointed as assistant professor in the Department of Biological Sciences at Stanford. With L.L. Cavalli-Sforza in 1973, he originated the quantitative theory of cultural evolution, initiating a research program in cultural transmission and gene-culture coevolution. His own research into human molecular evolution such as in China led him to international recognition. He is the author of more than 625 scientific papers and several books on evolution, ecology, and mathematical biology.

In addition, he is the founding editor of Theoretical Population Biology (1971–2013) and an associate editor of Genetics, Human Genetics, Annals of Human Genetics, Annals of Human Biology, and Complexity. He was the editor of The American Naturalist from 1984 to 1990. He was a member of the board of trustees at the Santa Fe Institute from 1984 to 2006.

== Award and honors ==
- Guggenheim Fellowship in 1976–1977
- Fellow of the Center for Advanced Study in the Behavioral Sciences, Stanford in 1983–84
- Elected Fellow of the American Association for the Advancement of Science in 1986
- Elected member of the American Society of Human Genetics
- Fellow of the American Academy of Arts & Sciences in 1987
- Fellow of the California Academy of Sciences in 1996
- China Population Study Award in 1998
- Honorary doctorate of philosophy from the Hebrew University of Jerusalem in 2005
- Honorary doctorate of philosophy from the Tel Aviv University in 2010
- Honorary professor at Beijing Normal University in 2002–2007
- Honorary professor at Xi’an Jiaotong University in 2005
- Paper of the Year 2003 award for biomedical science from The Lancet in 2003
- Dan David Prize in 2011
- Elected member of the American Philosophical Society in 2011
- Elected member of the US National Academy of Sciences in 2013
- Kimura Motoo award in human evolution in 2016
- Alumni lifetime achievement award, University of Western Australia, in 2016
- Honorary doctorate of philosophy from the University of St Andrews in 2022
- Lifetime Achievement Award, Society for the Study of Evolution, in 2022
- Lifetime Research Achievement Award, Society for Molecular Biology and Evolution, in 2024
