= National Youth Science Camp =

- Logo
- Abbreviation: NYSCamp
- Formation: 1963
- Headquarters: Charleston, West Virginia
- Location: Camp Pocahontas, West Virginia
- Parent organization: National Youth Science Academy
- Website: https://www.nyscamp.org

The National Youth Science Camp (NYSCamp) is a free residential honors program for two accomplished high school graduates from each state in the USA, plus Washington, DC. NYSCamp also accepts two delegates to represent Argentina, Bolivia, Brazil, Chile, Costa Rica, Ecuador, Mexico, and Trinidad and Tobago. NYSCamp's curriculum includes a broad range of science, technology, engineering, and mathematics (STEM) topics that incorporates both creative and performing arts as well as an outdoor adventure series with opportunities for mountain biking, spelunking, kayaking, and overnight backpacking. The delegation also travels to Washington, D.C., where they can meet congressional members, tour museums, and in recent years attend a panel discussion held at the American Association for the Advancement of Science. NYSCamp hopes to challenge delegates academically in exciting lectures and hands-on studies, and have voluntary opportunities to participate in an outdoor adventure program, gain a new and deep appreciation for the great outdoors, and establish friendships that last a lifetime. The NYSCamp is offered free of charge for all delegates selected to attend. Applications to apply to the NYSCamp generally open around beginning of November and close around the end of February for the following summer programming.

== History ==
The NYSCamp program was created as a part of West Virginia's centennial celebration in 1963 and was originally intended as a one-time celebration of youth and science.

In 1964, Neil Armstrong presented at the camp, and gave a lecture to the delegates describing NASA's plans to put a man on the moon. Five years later, just days before he was due to launch on Apollo 11, he sent a telegram to the camp expressing his commendation.

From 1963 to 1974, all of the delegates were male, but beginning in 1975, it accepted both male and female delegates.

== Camp Directors ==
1963-1970 Charles N. Cochran
1971-1975 Joseph M. Hutchison
1976-1985 Roderick W. Wilson
1986-1987 James C. Shuman, Ed.D.
1988-1990 Betsy Atkins Miller
1991-1992 Kathryn Hoy Burgess, Ph.D.
1993 Ray Rappold
1994-1996 Don Smith
1997-2001 Paul M. Miller, Ph.D.
2002-2011 Andrew Blackwood, Ed.D.
2012-2014 Desiree Henrickson
2015-2017 John P. Giroir
2018-2019 Andrew Blackwood, Ed.D.
2020–2023 Brian E. Kinghorn, Ph.D.
2024-Present Kiona Y. Meade

== Notable alumni ==
- Lee Altenberg, California, 1975
- Marissa Mayer, Wisconsin, 1993
- Robert Mercer, New Mexico, 1964
- Julie A. Robinson, Idaho, 1985
