= G-matrix =

In linear algebra, a real invertible matrix $A$ is called a G-matrix if $A^{-T}=D_1AD_2$ (where $A^{-T}$ means $(A^{-1})^T$) for some real diagonal matrices $D_1$ and $D_2$.

The term "G-matrix" was coined by Miroslav Fiedler and Frank J. Hall. It is sometimes called a semi-orthogonal matrix in research literature, although the latter term may also refer to a different kind of matrix, namely, a non-square matrix with orthogonal columns/rows.

All real orthogonal matrices and real invertible diagonal matrices, for instances, are G-matrices.

== Properties ==
All matrices below are assumed to be real square matrices.

- If $A$ is a G-matrix, so are $A^T$ and $A^{-1}$.
- If $A$ is a G-matrix and $D$ is a nonsingular diagonal matrix, then both $AD$ and $DA$ are G-matrices.
- If $A$ is a G-matrix and $P$ is a permutation matrix, then both $AP$ and $PA$ are G-matrices.
- If $A$ is a G-matrix, then $A$ and $A^{-T}$ have the same entrywise zero pattern, i.e., $A_{ij}=0$ if and only if $(A^{-T})_{ij}=0$. Thus the entrywise zero patterns of $A$ and $A^{-1}$ are symmetric to each other.
- The direct sum of G-matrices is again a G-matrix.
- Compound matrices of a G-matrix are G-matrices.
- Kronecker products of G-matrices are G-matrices.
- Every nonsingular Cauchy matrix $C$ such that $C^{-1}e$ and $C^{-T}e$ are entrywise nonzero is a G-matrix. Here $e$ denotes the vector of ones.
