= Genotype–phenotype distinction =

Distinction made in genetics

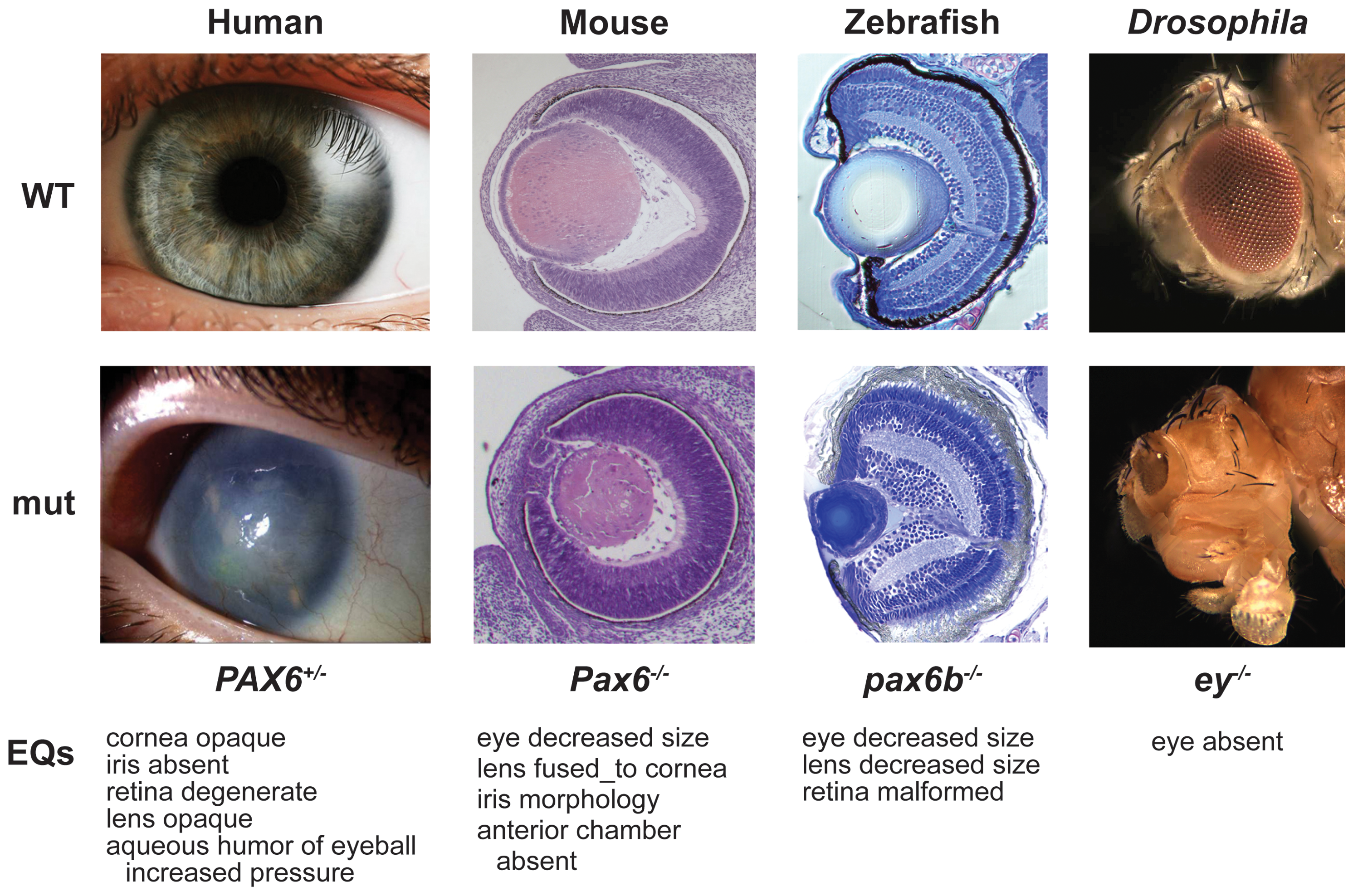
Similar genotypic changes may result in similar phenotypic alterations, even across a wide range of species.

The genotype–phenotype distinction is drawn in genetics. The "genotype" is an organism's full hereditary information. The "phenotype" is an organism's actual observed properties, such as morphology, development, or behavior. This distinction is fundamental in the study of inheritance of traits and their evolution.

== Overview ==
The terms "genotype" and "phenotype" were created by Wilhelm Johannsen in 1911, although the meaning of the terms and the significance of the distinction have evolved since they were introduced.

It is the organism's physical properties that directly determine its chances of survival and reproductive output, but the inheritance of physical properties is dependent on the inheritance of genes. Therefore, understanding the theory of evolution via natural selection requires understanding the genotype–phenotype distinction. The genes contribute to a trait, and the phenotype is the observable manifestation of the genes (and therefore the genotype that affects the trait). If a white mouse had recessive genes that caused the genes responsible for color to be inactive, its genotype would be responsible for its phenotype (the white color).

The mapping of a set of genotypes to a set of phenotypes is sometimes referred to as the genotype–phenotype map.

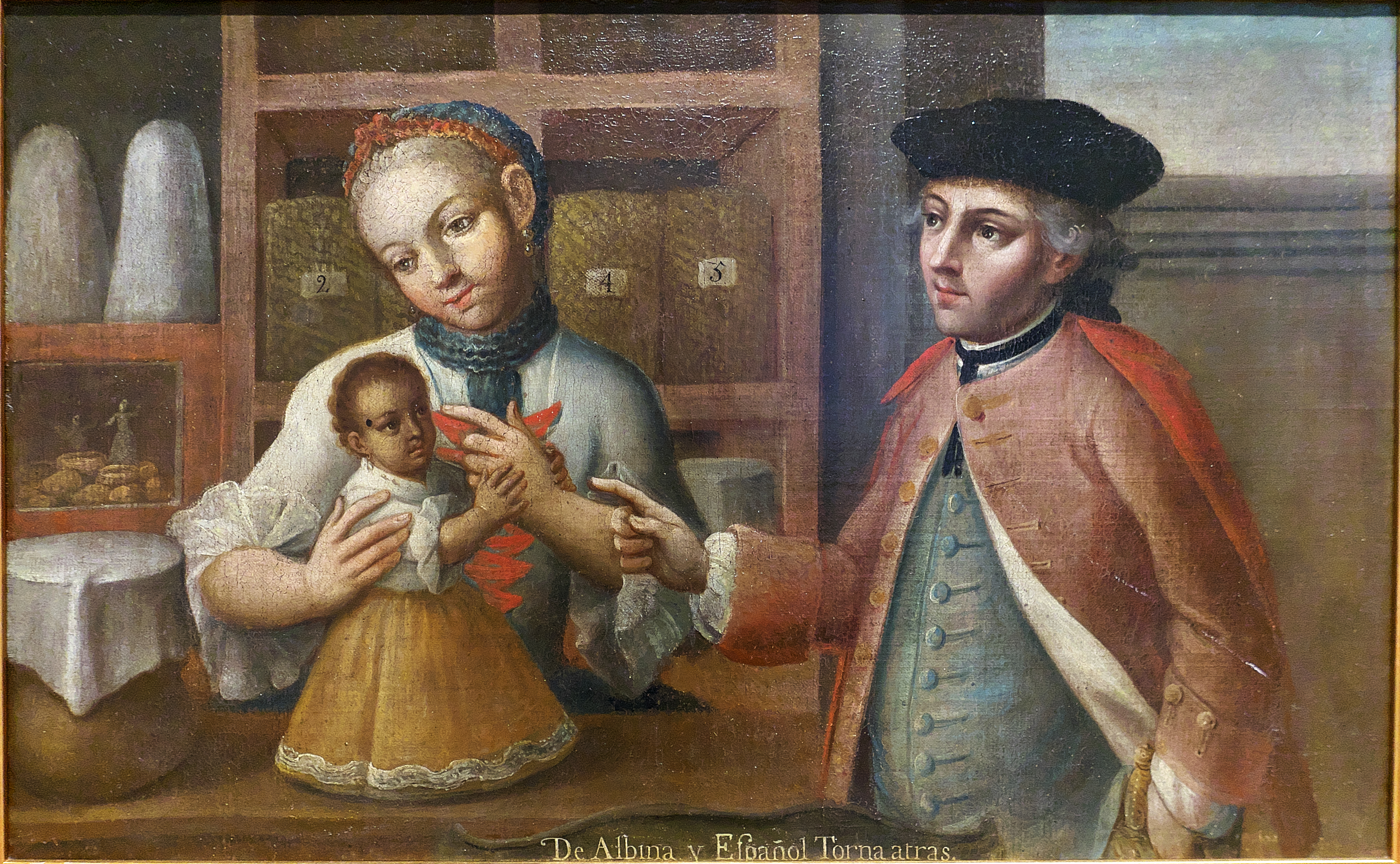
De Albina y Español, Torna atrás. Attributed to Juan Patricio Morlete Ruiz (1701-1770) In casta paintings, "torna atrás" described mixed-race individuals who expressed phenotypes dissimilar to their parents. In this painting, the daughter and mother are both of partial Sub-Saharan and European ancestry, yet have noticeably differing phenotypes.

An organism's genotype is but one of the factors in the development of its phenotype (with its influence being particularly strong in determining morphology). Two organisms with identical genotypes may differ in their phenotypes, due to phenotypic plasticity. To what extent a particular genotype influences a phenotype depends on the relative dominance, penetrance, and expressivity of the alleles in question.

One experiences this in everyday life with monozygous (i.e. identical) twins. Identical twins share the same genotype, since their genomes are identical; but they never have the same phenotype, although their phenotypes may be very similar. This is apparent in the fact that close relations can always tell them apart, even though others might not be able to see the subtle differences. Further, identical twins can be distinguished by their fingerprints, which are never completely identical.

== Phenotypic plasticity ==
The concept of phenotypic plasticity defines the degree to which an organism's phenotype is determined by its genotype. A high level of plasticity means that environmental factors have a strong influence on the particular phenotype that develops. If there is little plasticity, the phenotype of an organism can be reliably predicted from knowledge of the genotype, regardless of environmental peculiarities during development. An example of high plasticity can be observed in larval newts^{1}: when these larvae sense the presence of predators such as dragonflies, they develop larger heads and tails relative to their body size and display darker pigmentation. Larvae with these traits have a higher chance of survival when exposed to the predators, but grow more slowly than other phenotypes.

== Genetic canalization ==
In contrast to phenotypic plasticity, the concept of genetic canalization addresses the extent to which an organism's phenotype allows conclusions about its genotype. A phenotype is said to be canalized if mutations (changes in the genome) do not noticeably affect the physical properties of the organism. This means that a canalized phenotype may form from a large variety of different genotypes, in which case it is not possible to exactly predict the genotype from knowledge of the phenotype (i.e. the genotype–phenotype map is not invertible). If canalization is not present, small changes in the genome have an immediate effect on the phenotype that develops.

== Importance to evolutionary biology ==
According to Lewontin, the theoretical task for population genetics is a process in two spaces: a "genotypic space" and a "phenotypic space". The challenge of a complete theory of population genetics is to provide a set of laws that predictably map a population of genotypes (G_{1}) to a phenotype space (P_{1}), where selection takes place, and another set of laws that map the resulting population (P_{2}) back to genotype space (G_{2}) where Mendelian genetics can predict the next generation of genotypes, thus completing the cycle. Even if non-Mendelian aspects of molecular genetics are ignored, this is a gargantuan task. Visualizing the transformation schematically:

$$G_1 \; \stackrel{T_1}{\rightarrow} \; P_1 \; \stackrel{T_2}{\rightarrow} \; P_2 \; \stackrel{T_3}{\rightarrow} \; G_2 \;
\stackrel{T_4}{\rightarrow} \; G_1' \; \rightarrow \cdots$$

(adapted from Lewontin 1974, p. 12). T_{1} represents the genetic and epigenetic laws, the aspects of functional biology, or development, that transform a genotype into phenotype. This is the "genotype–phenotype map". T_{2} is the transformation due to natural selection, T_{3} are epigenetic relations that predict genotypes based on the selected phenotypes and finally T_{4} the rules of Mendelian genetics.

In practice, there are two bodies of evolutionary theory that exist in parallel, traditional population genetics operating in the genotype space and the biometric theory used in plant and animal breeding, operating in phenotype space. The missing part is the mapping between the genotype and phenotype space. This leads to a "sleight of hand" (as Lewontin terms it) whereby variables in the equations of one domain, are considered parameters or constants, where, in a full-treatment, they would be transformed themselves by the evolutionary process and are functions of the state variables in the other domain. The "sleight of hand" is assuming that the mapping is known. Proceeding as if it is understood is enough to analyze many cases of interest. For example, if the phenotype is almost one-to-one with genotype (sickle-cell disease) or the time-scale is sufficiently short, the "constants" can be treated as such; however, there are also many situations where that assumption does not hold.
