= Key innovation =

Concept in evolutionary biology

In evolutionary biology, a key innovation, also known as an adaptive breakthrough or key adaptation, is a novel phenotypic trait that allows subsequent radiation and success of a taxonomic group. Typically they bring new abilities that allows the taxa to rapidly diversify and invade niches that were not previously available. The phenomenon helps to explain how some taxa are much more diverse and have many more species than their sister taxa. The term was first used in 1949 by Alden H. Miller who defined it as "key adjustments in the morphological and physiological mechanism which are essential to the origin of new major groups", although a broader, contemporary definition holds that "a key innovation is an evolutionary change in individual traits that is causally linked to an increased diversification rate in the resulting clade".

The theory of key innovations has come under attack because it is hard to test in a scientific manner, but there is evidence to support the idea.

== Mechanism ==
The mechanism by which a key innovation leads to taxonomic diversity is not certain but several hypotheses have been suggested:

=== Increasing individual fitness ===
A key innovation may, by increasing the fitness of individuals of the species, result in extinction becoming less likely and allow the taxa to expand and speciate.

Latex and resin canals in plants are used to deter predators by releasing a sticky secretion when punctured which can immobilise insects and some contain toxic or foul tasting substances. They have evolved independently approximately 40 times and are considered a key innovation. By increasing the plant's resistance to predation the canals increase the species fitness and allow them to escape being eaten, at least until the predator evolves an ability to overcome the defence. During the period of resistance the plants are less likely to become extinct and can diversify and speciate, and as such taxa with latex and resin canals are more diverse than their canal lacking sister taxa.

=== Novel niche invasion ===
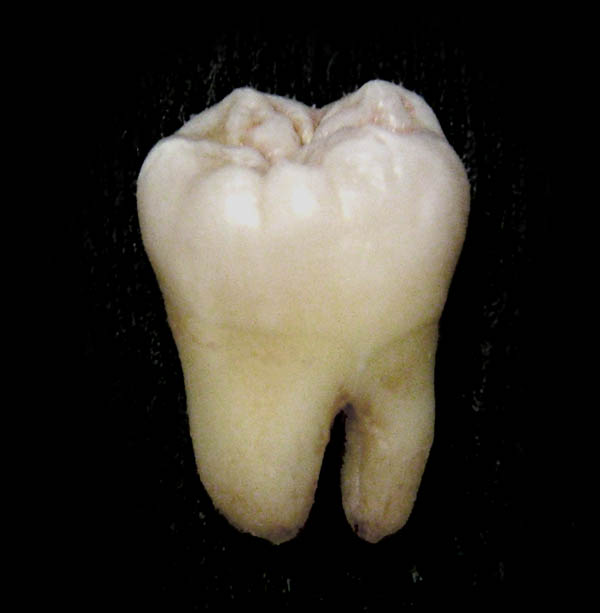
A human molar with four cusps

A key innovation may allow a species to invade a new region or niche and thus be freed from competition, allowing subsequent speciation and radiation.

A classic example of this is the fourth cusp of mammalian molars, the hypocone, which allowed early mammalian ancestors to effectively digest their generalised diet. The precursors to this, the triconodont teeth of reptiles, were adapted for gripping and slicing rather than chewing. The evolution of the hypocone and flat molars later allowed animals to adapt to a herbivorous diet as they could be used to break down tough plant matter through grinding. The evolution of this ability led to mammals being able to adapt to utilise a huge variety of food sources, and allowed early mammals to invade novel niches through the evolution of specialised herbivores, which experienced relative success during the middle eocene. Specialising for a plant based diet offered early herbivores sufficient resources to radiate as energy was not lost to higher trophic levels and few competitors existed at the time.

=== Reproductive isolation ===
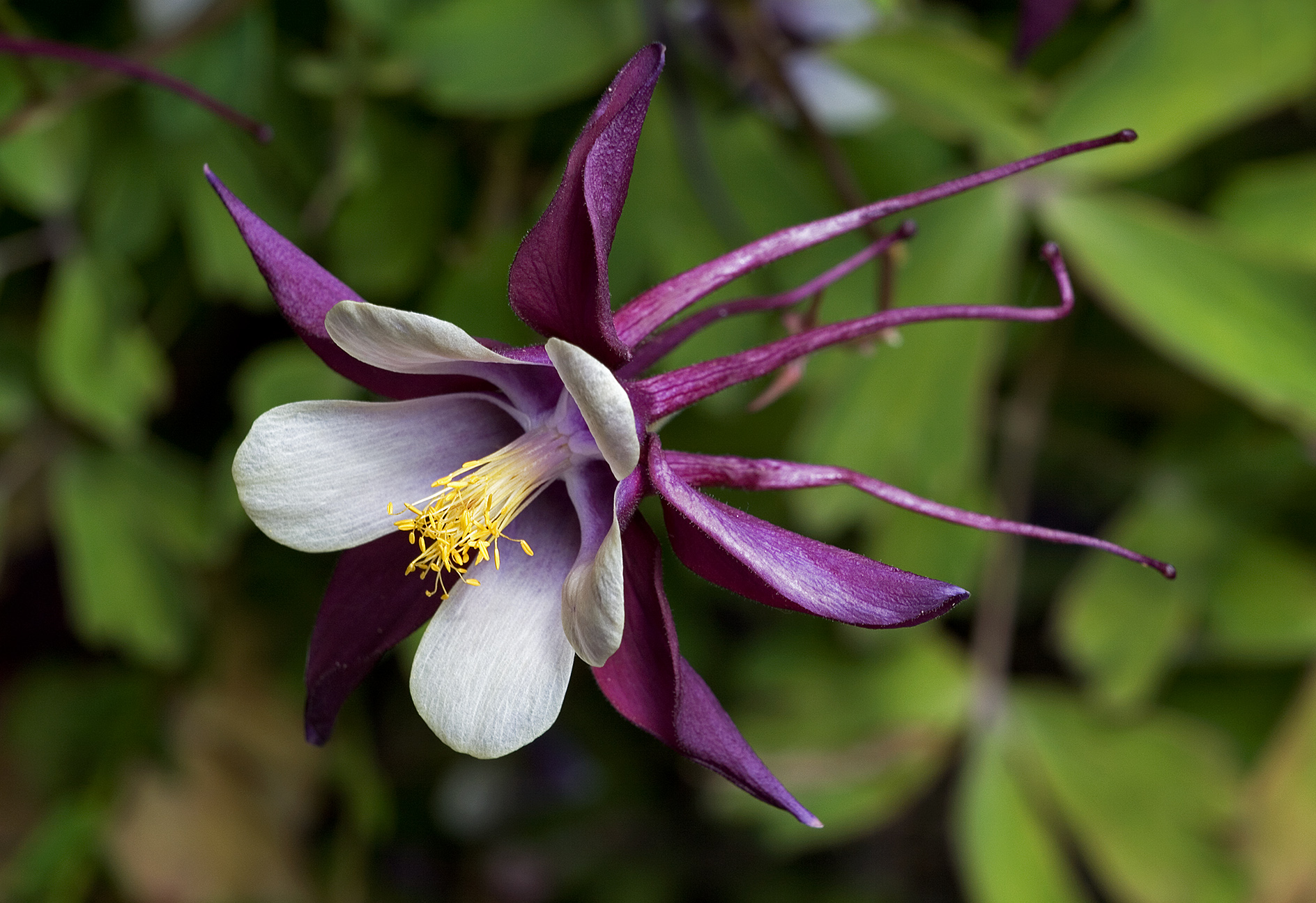
The long nectar spurs on this Aquilegia allow specialisation for a certain pollinator.

A key innovation may result in reproductive isolation, whereby those individuals with the innovation no longer breed with those without. This can lead to rapid speciation as the two populations separate and accumulate mutations.

The nectar spurs in Aquilegia, a diverse genus of flowering plant, are considered a key innovation because of this. Nectar spurs aid in pollination by making the nectar further from the stamen, ensuring that insect or bird pollinators pick up pollen as they access it. These led rapid speciation within the genus as plants and their pollinators can become specialised to each other i.e. a species of pollinator exclusively feeds from a species of plant, and thus plant populations could easily become reproductively isolated from one another. In addition the shape and size of the nectar spur can evolve in response to pollinator adaptations, developing a co-evolutionary relationship. The genus Aquilegia has over 50 species.

== Criticisms ==
As an evolutionary theory, key innovations has come under critical scrutiny due it being hard to test. Identification depends on finding a correlation between the innovation and increased diversity by comparing sister taxa, but this does not prove causality or isolate other causes of diversity such as stochasticity or habitat, and it is possible to 'cherry pick' examples that fit the hypothesis. In addition, the retrospective identification of key innovations offers little in terms of understanding the processes and pressures that resulted in the adaptation and may identify a very complex evolutionary process as a single event. An example of this is the evolution of avian flight, which was identified as a key innovation in 1963 by Ernst Mayr. However, separate evolutionary changes had to occur throughout the physiology of the avian ancestor, including the enlargement of the cerebellum and the enlargement and ossification of the sternum. These adaptations arose separately, and millions of years apart, not in one step.

== See also ==
- Adaptive radiation
- Natural selection
