= Theoretical Population Biology =

- Discipline: Population biology, demography, epidemiology
- Language: English
- Edited by: Jeremy Van Cleve

Publication details
- History: 1970–present
- Publisher: Elsevier
- Frequency: Bimonthly
- Open access: Hybrid
- Impact factor: 1.57 (2020)

Standard abbreviations
- ISO 4: Theor. Popul. Biol.

Indexing
- CODEN: TLPBAQ
- ISSN: 0040-5809 (print); 1096-0325 (web)
- LCCN: 73019414
- OCLC no.: 932477

Links
- Journal homepage; Online archive

Theoretical Population Biology is a peer-reviewed scientific journal covering research on theoretical aspects population biology in its widest sense, including mathematical modelling of populations, ecology, evolution, genetics, demography, and epidemiology. The editor-in-chief is Jeremy Van Cleve (University of Kentucky), who succeeded Noah A. Rosenberg in January 2025. Rosenberg succeeded the founding editor Marcus Feldman (Stanford University) in January 2013.

== Abstracting and indexing ==
The journal is abstracted and indexed in:

- AGRICOLA
- Biological Abstracts
- BIOSIS Previews
- Current Contents/Agriculture, Biology & Environmental Sciences
- Current Contents/Life Sciences
- EMBiology
- Ecology Abstracts
- Fisheries Review
- Genetics Abstracts
- MEDLINE
- Mathematical Reviews
- Population Index
- Science Citation Index
- Scopus
- Social Sciences Citation Index
- Zentralblatt MATH
- The Zoological Record

According to the Journal Citation Reports, the journal has a 2020 impact factor of 1.57.
