= Genotype–phenotype map =

Conceptual model in genetic architecture

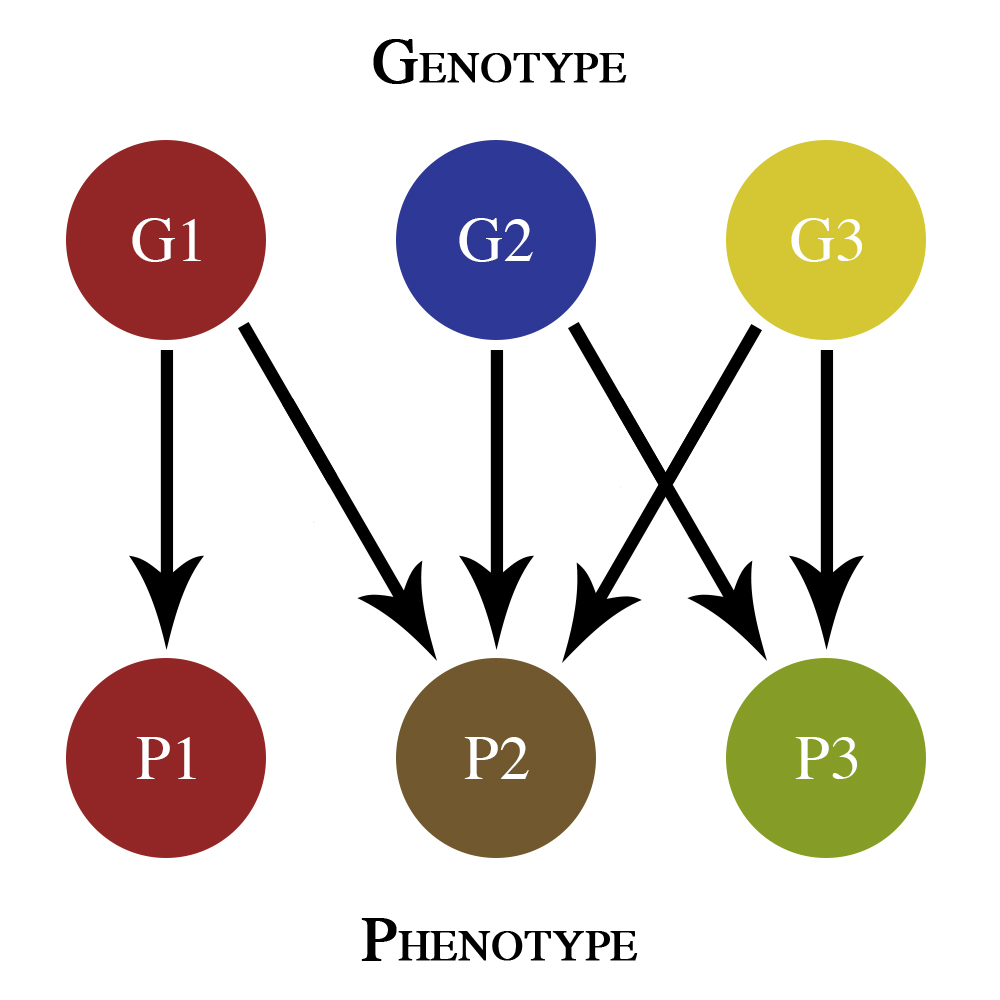
A very simple genotype–phenotype map that only shows additive pleiotropy effects.

The genotype–phenotype map is a conceptual model in genetic architecture. Coined in a 1991 paper by Pere Alberch, it models the interdependency of genotype (an organism's full hereditary information) with phenotype (an organism's actual observed properties).

== Application ==
The map visualises a relationship between genotype & phenotype which, crucially:

1. is of greater complexity than a straightforward one-to-one mapping of genotype to/from phenotype.
2. accommodates a parameter space, along which at different points a given phenotype is said to be more or less stable.
3. accommodates transformational boundaries in the parameter space, which divide phenotype states from one another.
4. accounts for different polymorphism and/or polyphenism in populations, depending on their area of parameter space they occupy.

== See also ==
- Genotype–phenotype distinction
