= Mutation bias =

Mutation bias refers to a predictable or systematic difference in rates for different types of mutation. The types are most often defined by the molecular nature of the mutational change, but sometimes they are based on downstream effects, e.g., Ostrow, et al. refer to "mutational bias for body size".

== Scientific context ==
The concept of mutation bias appears in several scientific contexts, most commonly in molecular studies of evolution, where mutation biases may be invoked to account for such phenomena as systematic differences in codon usage or genome composition between species. The short tandem repeat (STR) loci used in forensic identification may show biased patterns of gain and loss of repeats. In cancer research, some types of tumors have distinctive mutational signatures that reflect differences in the contributions of mutational pathways. Mutational signatures have proved useful in both detection and treatment.

Recent studies of the emergence of resistance to anti-microbials and anti-cancer drugs show that mutation biases are an important determinant of the prevalence for different types of resistant strains or tumors. Thus, a knowledge of mutation bias can be used to design more evolution-resistant therapies.

When mutation bias is invoked as a possible cause of some pattern in evolution, this is generally an application of the theory of arrival biases, and the alternative hypotheses may include selection, biased gene conversion, and demographic factors. Evidence for an evolutionary impact of mutation biases on changes involved in adaptation is summarized in the Arrival Bias article (note that argued in 2019 that this line of argument is flawed and that apparently mutation-biased patterns of change are better explained by selection).

In the past, due to the technical difficulty of detecting rare mutations, most attempts to characterize the mutation spectrum were based on reporter gene systems, or based on patterns of presumptively neutral change in pseudogenes. More recently, there has been an effort to use the MA (mutation accumulation) method and high-throughput sequencing (e.g., ).

== Types ==
=== Transition-transversion bias ===
The canonical DNA nucleotides include 2 purines (A and G) and 2 pyrimidines (T and C). In the molecular evolution literature, the term transition is used for nucleotide changes within a chemical class, and transversion for changes from one chemical class to the other. Each nucleotide is subject to one transition (e.g., T to C) and 2 transversions (e.g., T to A or T to G).

Because a site (or a sequence) is subject to twice as many transversions as transitions, the total rate of transversions for a sequence may be higher even when the rate of transitions is higher on a per-path basis. In the molecular evolution literature, the per-path rate bias is typically denoted by κ (kappa), so that, if the rate of each transversion is u, the rate of each transition is κu. Then, the aggregate rate ratio (transitions to transversions) is R = (1 * κu) / (2 * u) = κ / 2. For instance, in yeast, κ ~ 1.2, therefore the aggregate bias is R = 1.2 / 2 = 0.6, whereas in E. coli, κ ~ 4 so that R ~ 2.

In a variety of organisms, transition mutations occur several-fold more frequently than expected under uniformity. The bias in animal viruses is sometimes much more extreme, e.g., 31 of 34 nucleotide mutations in a recent study in HIV were transitions. As noted above, the bias toward transitions is weak in yeast, and appear to be absent in the grasshopper Podisma pedestris.

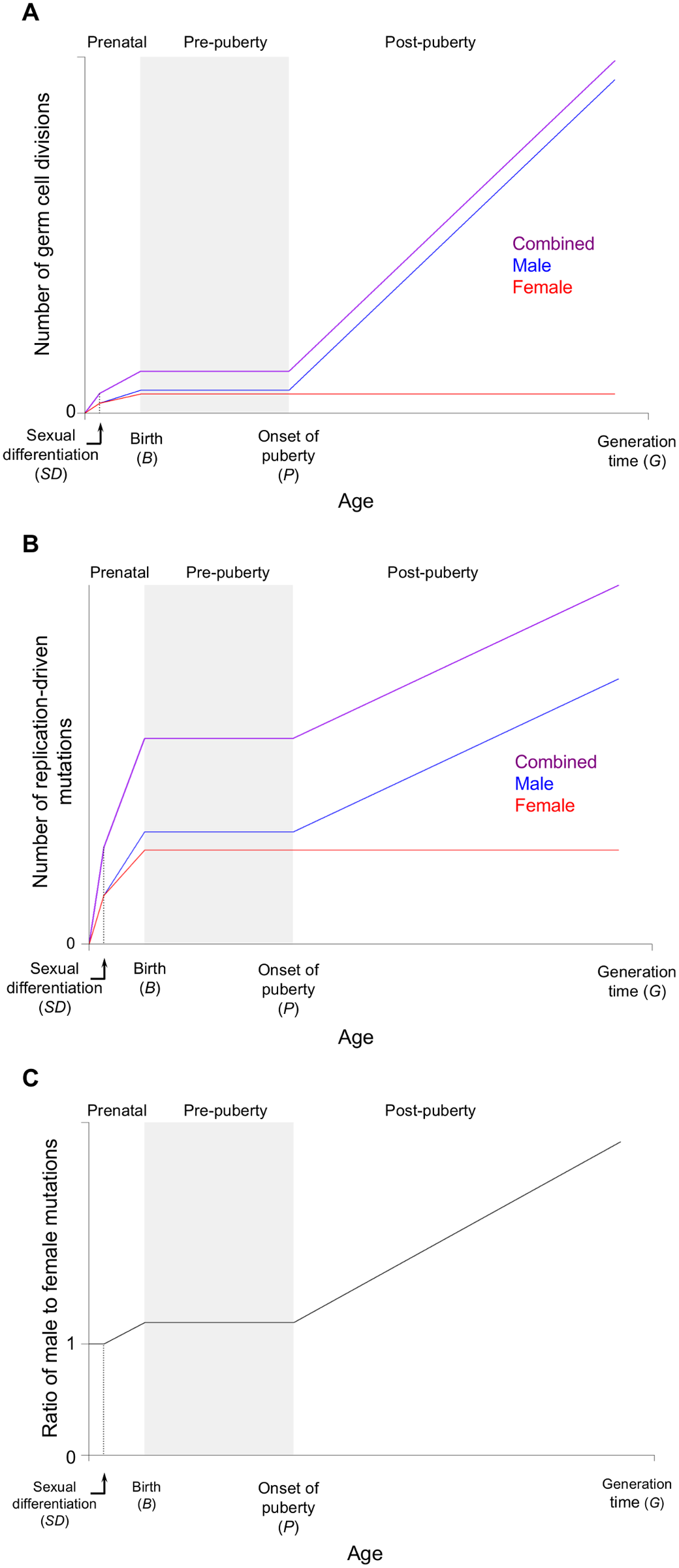
The accumulation of replication-driven mutations with sex and age

=== Male mutation bias ===
==== Definition ====
Male mutation bias is also called "Male-Driven Evolution". The rate of male germline mutations is generally higher than in females. The phenomenon of Male mutation bias have been observed in many species.

==== Origin ====
In 1935, the British-Indian scientist J.B.S. Haldane found that in hemophilia, the blood clotting disorder originated on the X chromosomes is due to fathers' germline mutation. Then he proposed the hypothesis that the male germline contributes inordinately more mutations to succeeding generations than that in the female germline mutation.

==== Evidence ====
In 1987, Takashi Miyata at al. designed an approach to test Haldane's hypothesis. If α is the ratio of the male mutation rate to the female mutation rate, Y and X are denoted as Y and X-linked sequence mutation rate, he include that the ratio of Y-linked sequence mutation rate to X-linked sequence mutation rate is:

$Y/X = \frac{3\alpha}{2+\alpha}$

The mean Y/X ratio is 2.25 in higher primates. By using the equation, we could estimate the ratio of male to female mutation rates α ≈ 6. In some organisms with a shorter generation time than humans, the mutation rate in males is also larger than those in females. Because their cell divisions in males are usually not that large. The ratio of the number of germ cell divisions from one generation to the next in males to females is less than that in human.

There are also other hypotheses that want to explain the male mutation bias. They think it may be caused by the mutation rate in the Y-linked sequence higher than the X-linked sequence mutation rate. The male germline genome is heavily methylated and more inclined to mutate than females. X chromosomes experience more purifying selection mutations on hemizygous chromosomes. To test this hypothesis, people use birds to study their mutation rate. Contrary to humans, bird males are homogametes (WW), and females are heterogametes (WZ). They found that the bird male-to-female ratio in mutation rates ranges from 4 to 7. It also proved that the mutation bias is mostly resulted from more male germline mutation than the female.

==== Explanation ====
A mutation is a heritable variation in the genetic information of a short region of DNA sequences. Mutations can be categorized into replication-dependent mutations and replication-independent mutations. Therefore, there are two kinds of mutation mechanisms to explain the phenomenon of male mutation bias.

===== Replication-dependent mechanism =====
The number of germ cell divisions in females are constant and are much less than that in males. In females, most primary oocytes are formed at birth. The number of cell divisions occurred in the production of a mature ovum is constant. In males, more cell divisions are required during the process of spermatogenesis. Not only that, the cycle of spermatogenesis is never-ending. Spermatogonia will continue to divide throughout the whole productive life of the male. The number of male germline cell divisions at production is not only higher than female germline cell divisions but also mounting as the age of the male increases.

One might expect the male mutation rate would be similar to the rate of male germline cell divisions. But only few species conform to the estimation of the male mutation rate. Even in these species, the ratio of male-to-female mutation rate is lower than the ratio of male-to-female in the number of germline cell divisions.

===== Replication-independent mechanism =====
The skew estimates of the male-to-female mutation rate ratio introduce the other important mechanism that highly influences male mutation bias. Mutations at CpG sites result in a C-to-T transition. These C-to-T nucleotide substitutions occur 10-50 times faster than that at rest sites in DNA sequences, especially likely appeared in the male and female germlines. The CpG mutation barely expresses any sex biases because of the independence of replication, and effectively lower the ratio of male-to-female mutation rate. Besides, neighbor-dependent mutations can also cause biases in mutation rate, and may have no relevance to DNA replication. For example, if mutations originated by the effect of mutagens show weak male mutation bias, such as exposure to the UV light.

=== GC-AT bias ===
A GC-AT bias is a bias with a net effect on GC content. For instance, if G and C sites are simply more mutable than A and T sites, other things being equal, this would result in a net downward pressure on GC content. Mutation-accumulation studies indicate a strong many-fold bias toward AT in mitochondria of D. melanogaster, and a more modest 2-fold bias toward AT in yeast.

A common idea in the literature of molecular evolution is that codon usage and genome composition reflect the effects of mutation bias, e.g., codon usage has been treated with a mutation-selection-drift model combining mutation biases, selection for translationally preferred codons, and drift. To the extent that mutation bias prevails under this model, mutation bias toward GC is responsible for genomes with high GC content, and likewise the opposite bias is responsible for genomes with low GC content.

Starting in the 1990s, it became clear that GC-biased gene conversion was a major factor—previously unanticipated—in affecting GC content in diploid organisms such as mammals.

Similarly, although it may be the case that bacterial genome composition strongly reflects GC and AT biases, the proposed mutational biases have not been demonstrated to exist. Indeed, Hershberg and Petrov suggest that mutation in most bacterial genomes is biased toward AT, even when the genome is not AT-rich.

=== Other instances ===
- Phenotypic variation may show developmental biases
- STR loci may exhibit biases to expand or contract
- In mammals and birds, CpG sites are mutation hotspots
- Flanking nucleotides affect mutation rate in mammals
- Transcription enhances mutation in a strand-specific manner

== Taxonomic diversity ==
Mutation biases are not constant, but vary taxonomically, as shown in the table below from, and by conditions such as nutritional state.

Mutation bias estimates from mutation-accumulation studies, from Table 2 of. AT bias values are weighted by genomic nucleotide composition. The M. smegmatis isolate is a naturally occurring mutator strain. References are given in Table 2 of.
| Group | Species | AT Bias | Ts:Tv Bias | Nonsyn:Syn Ratio | Ins:Del Ratio |
|---|---|---|---|---|---|
| Prokaryotes | Bacillus subtilis NCIB3610 | 0.60 | 6:1 | 3:1 | — |
| Prokaryotes | Burkholderia cenocepacia | 0.83 | 2:1 | 3:1 | 0.94 |
| Prokaryotes | Deinococcus radiodurans | 0.49 | 3:1 | 3:1 | 1.11 |
| Prokaryotes | Escherichia coli K12 substr. MG1655 | 1.24 | 3:1 | 2:1 | 0.40 |
| Prokaryotes | Escherichia coli ED1a | 2.09 | 3:1 | 3:1 | 0.19 |
| Prokaryotes | Escherichia coli IAI1 | 2.04 | 2:1 | 2:1 | 0.19 |
| Prokaryotes | Mesoplasma florum L1 | 15.97 | 3:1 | 6:1 | 0.98 |
| Prokaryotes | Mycobacterium smegmatisb | 0.73 | 3:1 | 2:1 | 2.14 |
| Prokaryotes | Vibrio cholerae 2740–80 | 2.71 | 3:1 | 2:1 | 0.29 |
| Prokaryotes | Vibrio fischeri ES114 | 4.26 | 2:1 | 5:1 | 0.58 |
| Unicell. euk. | Bathycoccus prasinos | 2.89 | 1:1 | 2:1 | 1.00 |
| Unicell. euk. | Chlamydomonas reinhardtii | 1.10 | 1:1 | — | 1.60 |
| Unicell. euk. | Chlamydomonas reinhardtii | 2.88 | 2:1 | 2:1 | 0.84 |
| Unicell. euk. | Micromonas pusilla | 1.00 | 2:1 | 3:1 | 0.17 |
| Unicell. euk. | Ostreococcus mediterraneus | 1.31 | 3:1 | 4:1 | 0.38 |
| Unicell. euk. | Ostreococcus tauri | 1.74 | 7:1 | 2:1 | 0.63 |
| Unicell. euk. | Paramecium tetraurelia | 12.86 | 1:1 | 2:1 | _ (5:0) |
| Unicell. euk. | Saccharomyces cerevisiae | 3.96 | 1:1 | 3:1 | _ (0:1) |
| Unicell. euk. | Saccharomyces cerevisiae | 2.23 | 2:1 | 3:1 | 0.45 |
| Unicell. euk. | Schizosaccharomyces pombe | 2.65 | 2:1 | 3:1 | 6.00 |
| Unicell. euk. | Schizosaccharomyces pombe | 2.97 | 1:1 | 2:1 | 6.13 |
| Unicell. euk. | Tetrahymena thermophila | 10.04 | 3:1 | 2:1 | — |
| Multicell. euk. | Arabidopsis thaliana | 6.09 | 5:1 | 3:1 | 0.50 |
| Multicell. euk. | Caenorhabditis elegans | 2.24 | 1:1 | 2:1 | — |
| Multicell. euk. | Daphnia pulex | 2.69 | 3:1 | — | — |
| Multicell. euk. | Drosophila melanogaster | 2.08 | 2:1 | 2:1 | 0.17 |
| Multicell. euk. | Drosophila melanogaster | 4.33 | 6:1 | 9:1 | 0.20 |
| Multicell. euk. | Drosophila melanogaster | 2.85 | 2:1 | 3:1 | 0.33 |
| Multicell. euk. | Drosophila melanogaster | 3.84 | 2:1 | 3:1 | 0.32 |
| Multicell. euk. | Drosophila melanogaster | 3.12 | 2:1 | — | — |
| Multicell. euk. | Pristionchus pacificus | 5.16 | 2:1 | 3:1 | — |

== Related concepts ==
The concept of mutation bias, as defined above, does not imply foresight, design, or even a specially evolved tendency, e.g., the bias may emerge simply as a side-effect of DNA repair processes. Currently there is no established terminology for mutation-generating systems that tend to produce useful mutations. The term "directed mutation" or adaptive mutation is sometimes used with the implication of a process of mutation that senses and responds to conditions directly. When the sense is simply that the mutation system is tuned to enhance the production of helpful mutations under certain conditions, the terminology of "mutation strategies" or "natural genetic engineering" has been suggested, but these terms are not widely used. As argued in Ch. 5 of Stoltzfus 2021, various mechanisms of mutation in pathogenic microbes, e.g., mechanisms for phase variation and antigenic variation, appear to have evolved so as to enhance lineage survival, and these mechanisms are routinely described as strategies or adaptations in the microbial genetics literature, such as by Foley 2015.
