= Reciprocal causation =

Biological concept

In biology, reciprocal causation arises when developing organisms are both products of evolution as well as causes of evolution. Formally, reciprocal causation exists when process A is a cause of process B and, subsequently, process B is a cause of process A, with this feedback potentially repeated. Some researchers, particularly advocates of the extended evolutionary synthesis, promote the view that causation in biological systems is inherently reciprocal.

== History ==
Harvard evolutionary biologist Ernst Mayr (1961) suggested that there are two fundamentally different types of causation in biology, 'ultimate' and 'proximate'. Ultimate causes (e.g. natural selection) were seen as (i) providing historical accounts for the existence of an organism's features, and (ii) explaining the function or 'goal-directedness' of living beings. In contrast, proximate causes (e.g. physiology) were seen as explaining how biological systems work. According to Mayr, the evolutionary sciences study ultimate causes and the rest of biology studies proximate causes. In some of his works, Mayr considered these domains autonomous:

"The clarification of the biochemical mechanism by which the genetic program is translated into the phenotype tells us absolutely nothing about the steps by which natural selection has built up the particular genetic program."

Mayr, 1980

There has been widespread acceptance of the proximate-ultimate dichotomy within the evolutionary sciences. However, many biologists, psychologists and philosophers have taken issue with Mayr's corollary that the proximate-ultimate distinction implies that development is irrelevant to evolution. For instance, evolutionary biologist Mary Jane West-Eberhard writes:

"The proximate-ultimate distinction has given rise to a new confusion, namely, a belief that proximate causes of phenotypic variation have nothing to do with ultimate, evolutionary explanation."

West-Eberhard, 2003

Mayr's position implied a unidirectional or linear conception of causation for both development and evolution: genotypes cause phenotypes (proximate causation), whilst through natural selection, changes in environments cause changes in organisms (ultimate causation). Reciprocal causation was proposed as an alternative to this linear characterization. (see also) It emphasizes how causation cycles through biological systems recursively, allowing proximate causes to feed back and thereby feature in ultimate explanations.

== Reciprocal causation in evolutionary biology ==
Reciprocal causation features in several explanations within contemporary evolutionary biology, including sexual selection theory, coevolution, habitat selection, and frequency-dependent selection. In these examples, the source of selection on a trait coevolves with the trait itself, therefore causation is reciprocal and developmental processes potentially become relevant to evolutionary accounts. For instance, a peacock's tail evolves through mating preferences in peahens, and those preferences coevolve with the male trait. The 'ultimate explanation' for the male trait is the prior existence of female preferences, proximately manifest in differential peahen mate choice decisions, whilst the 'ultimate explanation' for the peahens' mating preferences is the prior existence of variation in the peacock's tail associated with fitness. This example illustrates how reciprocal causation is not a rejection of the proximate-ultimate distinction itself, but instead a rejection of the implication that developmental processes should not feature in evolutionary explanations.

Reciprocal causation also applies in other domains of evolutionary biology. The extended evolutionary synthesis emphasizes how developmental events, including both the causal effects of environments on organisms (for instance, arising through developmental plasticity, or epigenetic inheritance) and the causal effects of organisms on environments (e.g. niche construction), can direct the course of evolution. Developmental plasticity, niche construction, extra-genetic forms of inheritance and developmental bias are recognized as playing evolutionary roles that cannot be reduced to natural selection of genetically encoded characters or strategies. Proximate causes are not autonomous from natural selection, but rather feed back to influence the rate and direction of adaptive evolution. This goes beyond the recognition that ontogenetic processes can impose constraints on the action of selection, or that proximate and ultimate processes interact. Rather, developmental processes are also seen as a source of evolutionary novelty, initiators of evolutionary episodes, and co-directors of patterns of evolutionary change.

== Contention ==
Acceptance or rejection of Mayr's proximate-ultimate distinction may lie at the centre of several major debates within contemporary biology, concerning evo devo (evolutionary developmental biology), niche construction, cultural evolution, human cooperation, and the evolution of language. According to some biologists and philosophers, these disputes share a common pattern. On one side are researchers who consider that interaction and feedback processes traditionally characterized as 'proximate' have explanatory value for 'ultimate' evolutionary questions. Their concern is that the proximate-ultimate distinction has discouraged consideration of the manner in which developmental processes can set the evolutionary agenda, for instance, by introducing innovations, channeling phenotypic variation, or initiating evolutionary episodes through modifying selection pressures. On the other side are researchers who largely adopt Mayr's stance with a clean separation of proximate and ultimate causation. For the latter, a failure to respect Mayr's dichotomy is considered a sign of confusing an evolutionary explanation with a mechanistic explanation.
