= Ecological inheritance =

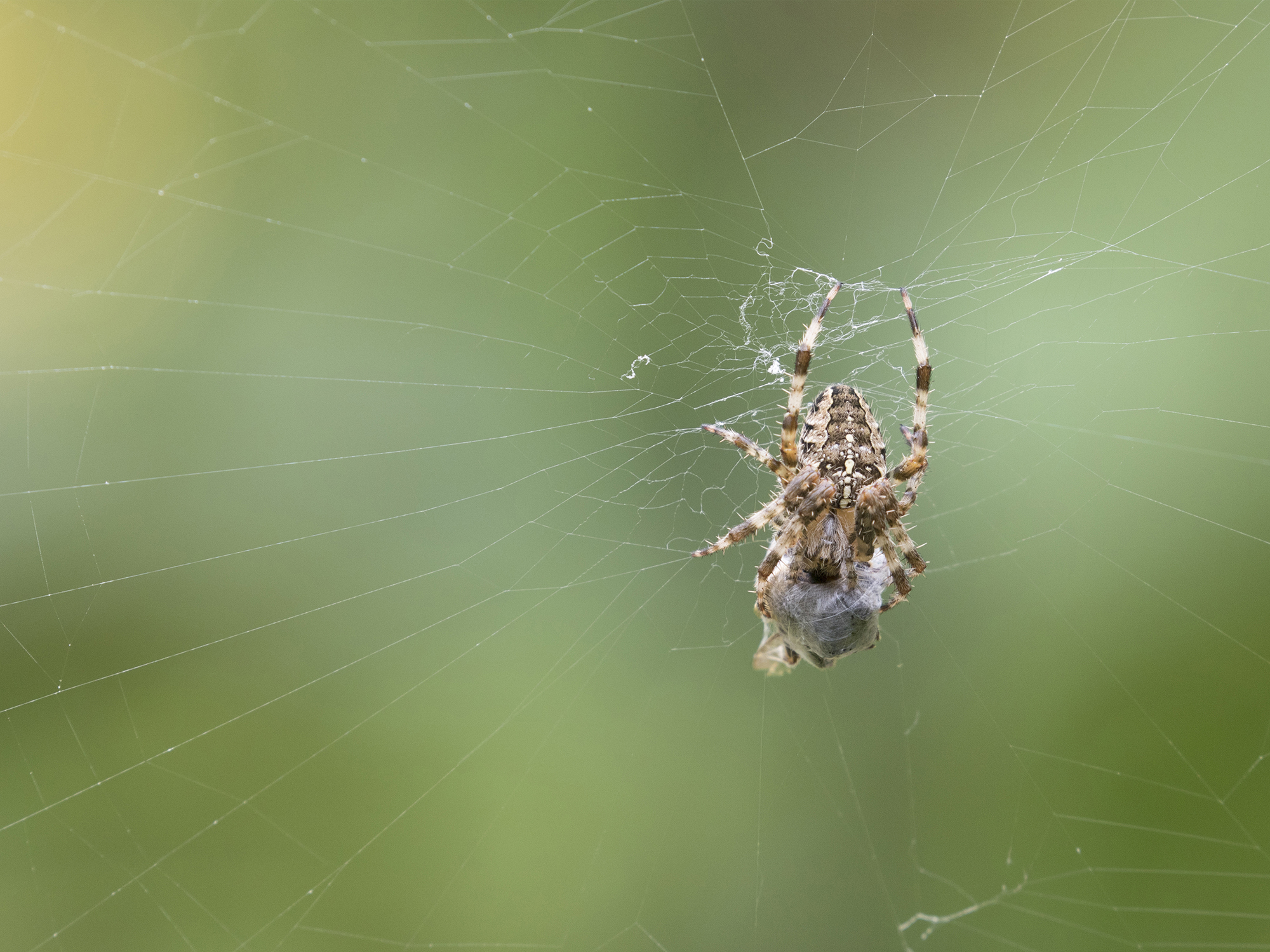
Orb-Web Spider

Ecological inheritance occurs when an organism's offspring inhabit a modified environment that a previous generation created. Therefore, the selective pressures created from the modifications must remain for the next generation in order for it to be deemed ecological inheritance. It was first described in Odling-Smee (1988) and Odling-Smee et al. (1996) as a consequence of niche construction. Standard evolutionary theory focuses on the influence that natural selection and genetic inheritance has on biological evolution, when individuals that survive and reproduce also transmit genes to their offspring. If offspring do not live in a modified environment created by their parents, then niche construction activities of parents do not affect the selective pressures of their offspring (see orb-web spiders in Genetic inheritance vs. ecological inheritance below). However, when niche construction affects multiple generations (i.e., parents and offspring), ecological inheritance acts an inheritance system different than genetic inheritance which is also termed "legacy effects".

== Factors of ecological inheritance ==
Since ecological inheritance is a result of ecosystem engineering and niche construction, the fitness of several species and their subsequent generations experience a selective pressure dependent on the modified environment they inherit. Organisms in subsequent generations will encounter ecological inheritance because they are affected by a new selective environment created by prior niche construction. On a macroevolutionary scale, ecological inheritance has been defined as, "... the persistence of environmental modifications by a species over multiple generations to influence the evolution of that or other species." Ecological inheritance has also been defined as, "... the accumulation of environmental changes, such as altered soil, atmosphere or ocean states that previous generations have brought about through their niche-constructing activity, and that influence the development of descendant organisms."

If when an organism or environment is responding to an environmental factor and certain factors and/or features of said organism/environment are advantageous in regards to natural selection, then those factors/features are related to niche construction and ecological inheritance. For example, a feature of the environment may have increased the fitness of an individual by enabling it to acquire a food resource or evade a predator more efficiently. In this context, natural selection promotes a correspondence between features and factors, defined as synerg. Ecological inheritance occurs when an organism experiences an altered factor-feature relationship with selected pressures originating from parents or ancestral generations. Richard Lewontin stresses how by modifying the availability of biotic and abiotic resources, niche-constructing organisms can cause organisms to coevolve with their environments.

== Examples ==
There can be examples of ecological inheritance within one species to impact just that one species. In the book, On the Origin of Species, Charles Darwin described ways that organisms alter selection pressures by modifying local environments (i.e., habitats in which they live) that affect their fitness. For example, the effect of ecological inheritance on long-term evolutionary dynamics are performed by subsequent generations of earthworm that burrow through soil. As earthworms burrow, they modify soil structure and enrich the nutrient content by mixing decomposing organic matter with inorganic soil content. The burrowing makes water easily available and absorbed by earthworms in the soil, and consequently, worms have kept their ancestral freshwater kidneys rather than evolve terrestrial anatomy.

Ecological inheritance can also involve the chemicals produced by organisms of different species such as the sea urchin Holopneustes purpurascens and the red alga Delisea pulchra. The sea urchin metamorphoses on the red alga during its early stages of life but then moves to the brown algae Ecklonia radiate because of the chemicals produced on the red algae that deter the sea urchin after a certain period of time. The secondary metabolites produced by the algae modify the environment that the sea urchin inhabits, thus resulting in changes for the following generations making this an example of ecological inheritance as well as chemical ecology.

Also, ecological inheritance can occur within a species that affects the entire biosphere, and thus ecological inheritance has significant implications for macroevolution. Ancestral species may modify environments through their niche construction that may have consequences for other species, sometimes millions of years later. For instance, cyanobacteria produced oxygen as a waste product of photosynthesis (see great oxygenation event), which dramatically changed the composition of the Earth's atmosphere and oceans, with vast macroevolutionary consequences.

Additionally, as organisms adapt to climate change, the alterations they make to the environment will become a part of the future of ecological inheritance.

== Ecological inheritance, ecosystem engineering, and niche construction ==
Almost all species engage in ecosystem engineering, which occurs when the availability of a resource is altered by organisms that create, alter, or destroy habitats. Niche construction occurs when the interactions and relationship between a species and its environment alters the niche and selective pressure of the species. Organisms modify their local environment, or habitat, by relocating to a different location or physically altering the selective environment; when these modifications alter the selection of subsequent generations, ecological inheritance occurs. Therefore, niche construction focuses on the evolutionary impact of species and their local environment. Ecosystem engineering has been described as a consequence of niche construction but it is not clear whether ecosystem engineering activities always influence selection. Ecological inheritance has been termed a 'persistor' that may influence evolution when the persistence of ecological inheritance is longer than the timing of the 'replicator' – a term Richard Dawkins used for gene.

== Genetic inheritance vs. ecological inheritance ==
Genetic inheritance depends on the processes of reproduction that transmit genes between generations, from parents to offspring. Ecological inheritance takes the form of biotically modified selection pressure that can be passed on by organisms in one generation at any time in their lifetime to organisms of subsequent generations which therefore are essentially inheriting a type of territory or property. Ecological inheritance does not depend on replication of environmental factors, but rather on the persistence of environmental factors that affect the selective pressures of subsequent generations. For example, the trait of web construction by orb-web spiders has been shaped by natural selection and is passed onto subsequent generations through genetic inheritance; spider webs are not a form of ecological inheritance because they are too transient and do not affect the evolution of multi-generational populations of spiders via niche construction. If, however, the physical characteristics of a modified environment created by one generation continue to exist for the descendants, then niche construction is affecting more than one generation and ecological inheritance has occurred, as in the example of earthworms described above.

In genetic inheritance, descendants inherit genes (acted upon by natural selection) from their parents that contain information in the nucleotide sequences of DNA used to express phenotypes; in ecological inheritance, information is not transmitted in the same way, but instead, characteristics of a modified environment affect the phenotypic expression of descendants. The mechanisms of genetic and ecological inheritance are also different; whereas genetic inheritance depends on reproduction (e.g., sexual and asexual) where genes are transmitted in one direction from parent to offspring in the same species, the modified environment and its selective pressures caused by ecological inheritance can be handed down from one species to any other species within and between generations.

== The modern synthesis ==
Ecological inheritance is considered a form of habitat construction, which has been considered a new way to expand upon natural selection as a way organisms influence their own evolution. Two assumptions under the Modern Synthesis are the following: (1) only genes are inherited from one generation to the next and (2) micro-evolutionary processes that include selection, drift, mutation, and gene flow affect patterns of macro-evolution. Since the early twentieth century, however, evolutionary biologists have modified the Modern Synthesis to include ways organisms modify the environment and inhabited by their subsequent generations. This new interpretation of the Modern Synthesis is called the extended evolutionary synthesis and describes how ecological inheritance affects evolution on micro- and macro-evolutionary scales because organisms modify their environments in non-random ways to generate selective pressures on subsequent generations.
