= Ecosystem engineer =

Ecological niche

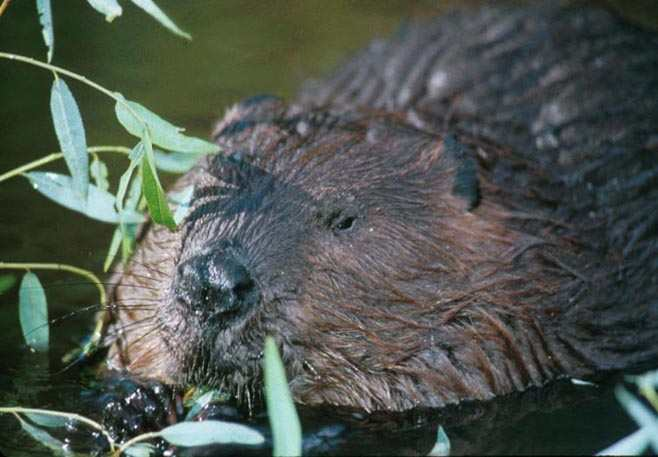
Beavers are the prototypical ecosystem engineer because of the effects their dams have on channel flow, geomorphology, and ecology.

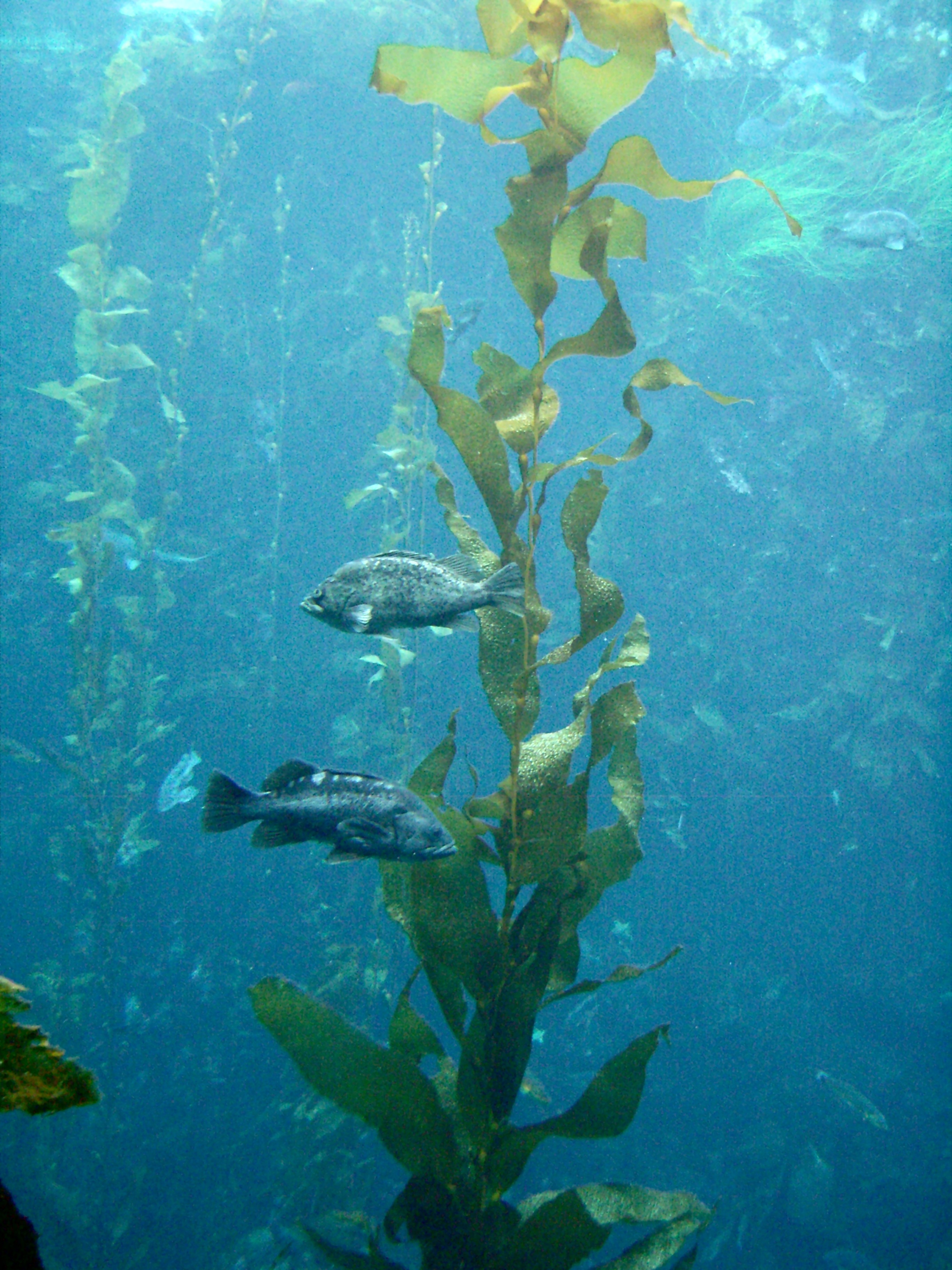
Kelp are autogenic ecosystem engineers, by building the necessary structure for kelp forests.

An ecosystem engineer is any species that creates, significantly modifies, maintains or destroys a habitat. These organisms can have a large impact on species richness and landscape-level heterogeneity of an area. As a result, ecosystem engineers are important for maintaining the health and stability of the environment they are living in. Since all organisms impact the environment they live in one way or another, it has been proposed that the term "ecosystem engineers" be used only for keystone species whose behavior very strongly affects other organisms.

== Types ==
Jones et al. identified two different types of ecosystem engineers:

=== Allogenic engineers ===
Allogenic engineers modify the biophysical environment by mechanically changing living or nonliving materials from one form to another. Beavers are the original model for ecosystem engineers; in the process of clearcutting and damming, beavers alter their ecosystem extensively. The addition of a dam will change both the distribution and the abundance of many organisms in the area. Caterpillars are another example in that by creating shelters from leaves, they are also creating shelters for other organisms which may occupy them either simultaneously or subsequently. An additional example may be that of woodpeckers or other birds who create holes in trees for them to nest in. Once these birds are through with them, the holes are used by other species of birds or mammals for housing.

=== Autogenic engineers ===
Autogenic engineers modify the environment by creating habitat through their body structures. Examples include Sphagnum moss, which forms peatlands inhabited by species adapted to acidic, waterlogged conditions, and trees, whose trunks and branches serve as substrates and shelter for lichens, mosses, squirrels, birds and insects. In the tropics, lianas connect trees, which allow many animals to travel exclusively through the forest canopy.

== Importance ==
Being able to identify ecosystem engineers in an environment can be important when looking at the influence these individuals may have over other organisms living in the same environment – especially in terms of resource availability. It's also vital to recognize that ecosystem engineers are not organisms that directly provide others with living or dead tissue. In other words, they are identified as engineers because of their ability to modify resources, not because of their trophic effect. While the impact of ecosystem engineers can be as great as keystone species, they differ in their types of impact. Keystone species are typically essential because of their trophic effect, while ecosystem engineers are not.

As with keystone species, ecosystem engineers are not necessarily abundant. Species with greater density and large per capita effect have a more easily-noticeable effect, but less abundant species can still have a large impact. A prime example is the mud shrimp Filhollianassa filholi, an ecosystem engineer with a small population density that nevertheless affects the temporal and spatial growth of macrofauna with its burrow structures.

The presence of some ecosystem engineers has been linked to higher species richness at the landscape level. By modifying the habitat, organisms like the beaver create more habitat heterogeneity and so can support species not found elsewhere. Thoughts may be that similar to other umbrella species by conserving an ecosystem engineer you may be able to protect the overall diversity of a landscape. Beavers have also been shown to maintain habitats in such a way as to protect the rare Saint Francis' satyr butterfly and increase plant diversity.

Biodiversity may also be affected by ecosystem engineer's ability to increase the complexity of processes within an ecosystem, potentially allowing greater species richness and diversity in the local environments. As an example, beavers have the capacity to modify riparian forest and expand wetland habitats, which results in an increase of the diversity of the habitats by allowing a greater number of species to inhabit the landscape. Coral-reef habitats, created by the ecosystem engineer coral species, hold some of the highest abundances of aquatic species in the world.

== Controversy ==
There is controversy around the usage of the term "ecosystem engineer" to classify a species, as it can be perceived as a "buzzword" to the ecological science community. The use of the term "ecosystem engineering" might suggest that the species was intentionally and consciously modifying its environment. Another argument postulates that the ubiquity of ecosystem engineers translates to all species being ecosystem engineers. This would invite more ecological research to be done to delve into the classification of an ecosystem engineer. The generality and the specifications of identifying an ecosystem engineer has been the root of the controversy, and now more research is being conducted to definitively classify and categorize species based on their impact as an ecosystem engineer.

== Classification ==
Ecosystem engineers do have their general types, allogenic and autogenic, but further research has suggested that all organisms can fall under specific cases. It was proposed that there were six specific cases. These cases were differentiated by the species' ability to transform their resources to different states, as well as their ability to combat abiotic forces. A state refers to the physical condition of a material and a change in state refers to a physical abiotic or biotic material change

Cases of Ecosystem Engineers
Case #	Autogenic or Allogenic	Rationale	Example
1	Autogenic	Not considered ecosystem engineering	Any species that are not considered ecosystem engineers.
2	Allogenic	Transform resources into usable and/or more beneficial forms	Cows, after eating grass, produce cow pats with their dung that are used by invertebrates as a food source and a shelter.
3	Autogenic	Organism transforms itself from one state to another and affects distribution and/or availability of resources and/or the traits of the physical environment.	Coral and forests grow, which induce developmental change in the environment surrounding them
4	Allogenic	Able to transform one material from one state to another	Beavers can take live trees and turn them into dead trees, then utilize those dead trees to build dams that are shelter for other animals and stabilize water flow in arid areas.
5	Autogenic	Modulate extreme abiotic forces, which then controls resource flow	Crustose coralline algae break waves and protect coral reefs from immense amounts of water force.
6	Allogenic	Species falls under one or more of these cases	Ribbed mussels secrete byssal threads that bind together to protect sediment and prevent erosion.

== Introduced species as ecosystem engineers ==
Species are able to be transported across all parts of the world by humans or human-made vessels at boundless rates resulting in foreign ecosystem engineers changing the dynamics of species interactions and the possibility for engineering to occur in locations that would not have been accessible by engineers without the mediation by humans.

Introduced species, which may be invasive species, are often ecosystem engineers. Kudzu, a leguminous plant introduced to the southeast U.S., changes the distribution and number of animal and bird species in the areas it invades. It also crowds out native plant species. The zebra mussel is an ecosystem engineer in North America. By providing refuge from predators, it encourages the growth of freshwater invertebrates through increasing microhabitats. Light penetration into infected lakes also improves the ecosystem, resulting in an increase in algae. In contrast to the benefits some ecosystem engineers can cause, invasive species often have the reverse effect.

== Humans as ecosystem engineers ==
Humans are thought to be the most dramatic ecosystem engineers. Niche construction has been prevalent since the earliest days of human activity. Through urban development, agricultural practices, logging, damming and mining, humans have changed the way they interact with the environment. This interaction is more studied in the field of human ecology. Considered both as an allogenic and autogenic engineers, humans do not necessarily fit into either category of ecosystem engineers. Humans are able to mimic autogenic effects as well as implement their own allogenic effects. Air-conditioning is one prime example of the way humans mimic autogenic effects

Due to the complexity of many communities and ecosystems, restoration projects are often difficult. Ecosystem engineers have been proposed as a means to restore a given area to its previous state. While ideally these would all be natural agents, with today's level of development some form of human intervention may be necessary as well. In addition to being able to assist in restoration ecology, ecosystem engineers may be a helpful agent in invasive species management. New fields are developing which focus on restoring those ecosystems which have been disrupted or destroyed by human activities as well as developing ecosystems that are sustainable with both human and ecological values.

== Examples ==
=== Terrestrial environments ===
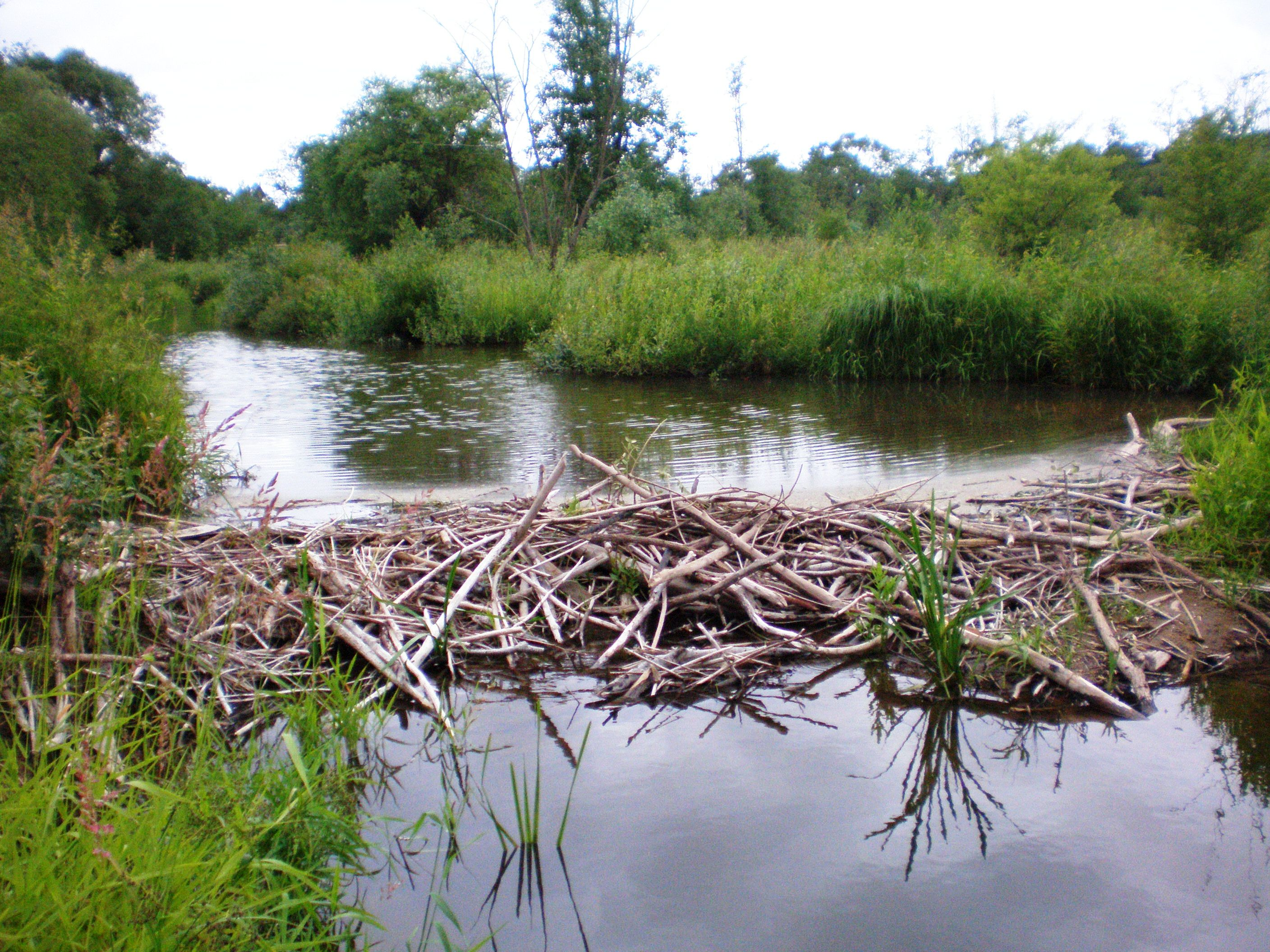
Beaver dam on Smilga River in Lithuania

Besides the previously mentioned beaver acting as an ecosystem engineer, other terrestrial animals do the same. This may be through feeding habits, migration patterns or other behaviors that result in more permanent changes.

Research has suggested primates as ecosystem engineers as a result of their feeding strategies – frugivory and folivory – making them act as seed dispersers. As a whole primates are very abundant and feed on a large quantity of fruit that is then distributed around their territory. Elephants have also been designated ecosystem engineers as they cause very large changes to their environment whether it be through feeding, digging or migratory behavior.

Prairie dogs are another terrestrial form of allogenic ecosystem engineers due to the fact that the species has the ability to perform substantial modifications by burrowing and turning soil. They are able to influence soils and vegetation of the landscape while providing underground corridors for arthropods, avians, other small mammals, and reptiles. This has a positive effect on species richness and diversity of their habitats which results in the prairie dogs being labelled as keystone species.

Arthropods can also be ecosystem engineers, such as spiders, ants, and many types of larvae that create shelters out of leaves, as well as gall-inducing insects that change the shapes of plants. Bark beetles are an ecosystem engineer of forest ecosystems and can affect fire spread and severity when attacking their host pine species.

Not only animals are ecosystem engineers. Fungi are able to connect regions that are distant from one another and translocate nutrients between them. Doing so they create nutritional niches for xylophagous invertebrates, supply trees with nitrogen translocated from previously predated animals or even form an "underground pipeline" that redistributes carbon between trees. Thus fungi are engineers controlling nutrient cycles in ecosystems.

=== Marine environments ===
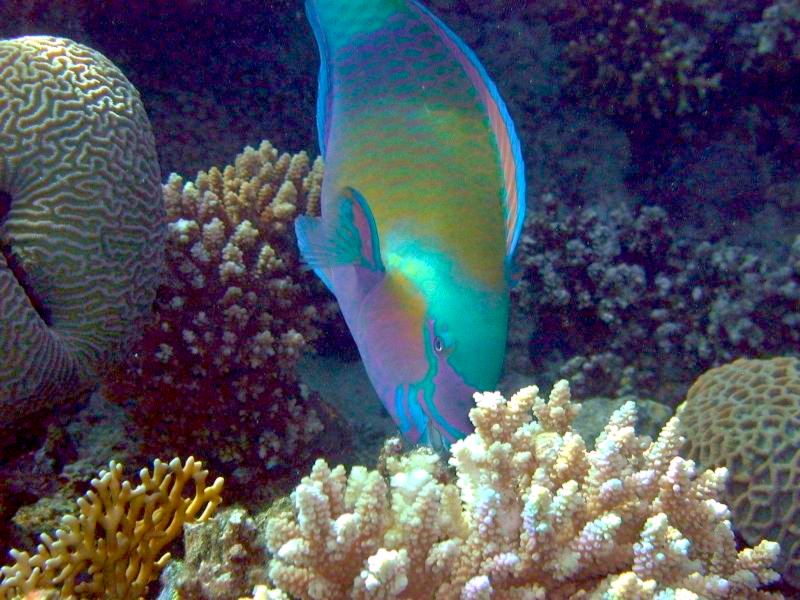
Parrotfish

In marine environments, filter feeders and plankton are ecosystem engineers because they alter turbidity and light penetration, controlling the depth at which photosynthesis can occur. This in turn limits the primary productivity of benthic and pelagic habitats and influences consumption patterns between trophic groups.

Another example of ecosystem engineers in marine environments would be scleractinian corals as they create the framework for the habitat most coral-reef organisms depend on. Some ecosystem engineers such as coral have help maintaining their environment. Parrotfish often help maintain coral reefs as they feed on macroalgae that competes with the coral. As this relationship is mutually beneficial, a positive feedback cycle is formed between the two organisms, making them both responsible for creating and maintaining coral reef ecosystems.

Whales are also being increasingly recognised for their role as ecosystem engineers despite the loss of up to 90% of their numbers during the commercial whaling era. Whales defecate at the surface and release nutrients that boost the growth of phytoplankton. As whales migrate across the oceans, and move up and down the water column, they help to spread these nutrients in a process that is known as the "Whale Pump".

== See also ==
- Niche construction
- Structures built by animals
- Nest-building in primates
