= Rui Diogo =

Biologist and author

- Born: Boliqueime Martins Diogo, Rui Pedro; Portugal
- Education: University of Aveiro (MS); University of Liège (PhD); George Washington University (PhD)
- Awards: Anatomical Society Award for Best Runner-Up Anatomical Paper (J. Anat.) in 2015; Outstanding Faculty Researcher Award of the Howard University College of Medicine in 2016/2017
- Scientific career
- Fields: Biology, anthropology, anatomy
- Institutions: Howard University

Rui Diogo is a Portuguese American biologist, researcher, speaker, and writer at Howard University with several published scientific books, whose research (including those of his lab) covers social issues such as racism, sexism, etc., using scientific data from many different fields of science (interdisciplinarity). His studies regarding evolutionary remnants in human babies in the womb has been widely reported. In 2017, he proposed Organic Nonoptimal Constrained Evolution.

== Education ==
He obtained his bachelor's degree in biology from the University of Aveiro, Portugal, and later did a PhD in biology at the University of Liege, Belgium, a postdoc at the King's College London, a postdoc at the Museo Nacional de Historia Natural de Madrid and then a master's and a Ph.D. at the Department of Anthropology of George Washington University, United States.

== Work ==
He is an associate professor of anatomy, Department of Anatomy, Howard University College of Medicine (US). He was among the 10 most cited/influential anatomists worldwide in 2019, 2020, 2021, 2022, 2023 and 2024 .

Diogo is an advocate of the extended evolutionary synthesis and has proposed a revision of evolutionary theory, which he has termed ONCE: Organic Nonoptimal Constrained Evolution. He wrote about this theory in his book Evolution Driven by Organismal Behavior, published in 2017. According to ONCE, evolution is mainly driven by the behavioural choices and persistence of organisms themselves, whilst natural selection plays a secondary role. The book was positively reviewed as an "impressive work that is jam-packed with complex concepts and ideas".

More recently, he has expanded his research to ecological and cultural conservation, both in Africa (he is the current recipient and single PI of NSF's grant "Excellence in Research: The Visible Ape Project" (NSF, Award Number: 1856329) and Asia (he is the current recipient and single PI of NSF's grant "The Making of a University Hub for Basic Cultural Anthropological Research Related to Cultural and Biodiversity Conservation" (NSF, Award Number: 2309069).

His groundbreaking research on these topics and on human evolution has gained widespread recognition and attention from major global media outlets, including BBC, CNN, and The New York Times, with more than 600 media pieces published in more than 50 countries about his research. Engaging with a diverse audience, he has participated in numerous TV interviews, documentaries, TED talks and radio shows, collaborating with media outlets worldwide. Having traveled to 150 countries, he is committed to challenging norms and advocating for inclusivity, significantly influencing global discourse about human evolution, biology and diversity, as exemplified by three of his later books, the highly-acclaimed “Evolution Driven by Organismal Behavior“ and, more recently, “Meaning of Life, Human Nature and Delusions“, and “Darwin’s Racism, Sexism and Idolization“.

== Books ==
=== Single author or co-author of the following books ===
- DIOGO, R. (2024). Darwin's racism, misogyny and idolization - their tragic societal and scientific repercussions. Springer (New York, US).
- DIOGO, R. (2021). Meaning of Life, Human Nature and Delusions - How Tales about Love, Sex, Races, Gods and Progress Affect Us and Earth's Splendor. Springer (New York, US).
- MONTERO, R., ADESOMO, A. & R. DIOGO (2021). On viruses, pandemics, and us: a developing story [De virus, pandemias y nosotros: una historia en desarollo]. Independently published, Tucuman, Argentina. 495 pages.
- DIOGO, R., J. ZIERMANN, J. MOLNAR, N. SIOMAVA & V. ABDALA (2018). Muscles of Chordates: development, homologies and evolution. Taylor & Francis (Oxford, UK). 650 pages.
- DIOGO, R., B. SHEARER, J. M. POTAU, J. F. PASTOR, F. J. DE PAZ, J. ARIAS-MARTORELL, C. TURCOTTE, A. HAMMOND, E. VEREECKE, M. VANHOOF, S. NAUWELAERTS & B. WOOD (2017). Photographic and descriptive musculoskeletal atlas of bonobos - with notes on the weight, attachments, variations, and innervation of the muscles and comparisons with common chimpanzees and humans. Springer (New York, US). 259 pages.
- DIOGO, R. (2017). Evolution driven by organismal behavior: a unifying view of life, function, form, mismatches and trends. Springer (New York, US). 252 pages.
- DIOGO, R., D. NODEN, C. M. SMITH, J. A. MOLNAR, J. BOUGHNER, C. BARROCAS & J. BRUNO (2016). Learning and understanding human anatomy and pathology: an evolutionary and developmental guide for medical students. Taylor & Francis (Oxford, UK). 348 pages.
- SMITH, C. M., J. M. ZIERMANN, J. A. MOLNAR, M. C. GONDRE-LEWIS, C. SANDONE, E. T. BERSU, M. A. AZIZ & R. DIOGO (2015). Muscular and skeletal anomalies in human trisomy in an evo-devo context: description of a T18 cyclopic newborn and comparison between Edwards (T18), Patau (T13) and Down (T21) syndromes using 3-D imaging and anatomical illustrations. Taylor & Francis (Oxford, UK). 217 pages.
- DIOGO, R., J.F. PASTOR, A. HARTSTONE-ROSE & M. N. MUCHLINSKI (2014). Baby gorilla: Photographic and descriptive atlas of the skeleton, muscles and internal organs - including CT scans and comparisons to other gorillas and primates. Taylor & Francis (Oxford, UK). 101 pages.
- DIOGO, R., J.M. POTAU, J.F. PASTOR, F. de PAZ, M.M. BARBOSA, E.M. FERRERO, G. BELLO, B.A. WOOD & M. A. AZIZ (2013). "Photographic and descriptive atlas of chimpanzees (Pan) - with notes on the attachments, variations, innervation, function, synonymy and weight of the muscles". Taylor & Francis (Oxford, UK). 149 pages.
- DIOGO, R., J.M. POTAU, J.F. PASTOR, F. de PAZ, M.M. BARBOSA, E.M. FERRERO, G. BELLO, B.A. WOOD & M. A. AZIZ (2013). "Photographic and descriptive atlas of orangutans (Pongo) - with notes on the attachments, variations, innervation, synonymy and weight of the muscles". Taylor & Francis (Oxford, UK). 150 pages.
- DIOGO, R. & WOOD, B. (2012). "Comparative anatomy and phylogeny of primate muscles and human evolution". Taylor & Francis (Oxford, UK). 1025 pages.
- DIOGO, R., J.M. POTAU, J.F. PASTOR, F. de PAZ, M.M. BARBOSA, E.M. FERRERO, G. BELLO, B.A. WOOD, A. BURROWS & M. A. AZIZ (2012). "Photographic and descriptive atlas of gibbons and siamangs (Hylobates) - with notes on the attachments, variations, innervation, synonymy and weight of the muscles". Taylor & Francis (Oxford, UK). 168 pages.
- DIOGO, R. & V. ABDALA (2010). "Muscles of Vertebrates: comparative anatomy, evolution, homologies and development". Taylor & Francis (Oxford, UK). 476 pages.
- DIOGO, R., J.M. POTAU, J.F. PASTOR, F. de PAZ, M.M. BARBOSA, E.M. FERRERO, G. BELLO & B.A. WOOD (2010). "Photographic and descriptive atlas of Gorilla - with notes on the attachments, variations, innervation, synonymy and weight of the muscles". Taylor & Francis (Oxford, UK). 132 pages.
- DIOGO, R. (2007). "Origin and evolution of higher clades: osteology, myology, phylogeny and macroevolution of bony fishes and the rise of tetrapods". Science Publishers (Enfield, US). 367 pages.
- DIOGO, R. (2004). "Morphological evolution, Aptations, Homoplasies, Constraints, and Evolutionary trends: catfishes as a case study on general phylogeny and macroevolution". Science Publishers (Enfield, US). 491 pages.

=== Edited Books ===
- ZIERMANN, J. M., R. DIAZ & R. DIOGO (2019). "Heads, jaws and muscles: anatomical, functional, and developmental diversity in Chordate evolution". Springer (New York, US). 303 pages.
- GRANDE, T., F. POYATO-ARIZA & R. DIOGO (2009). "Gonorynchiformes and ostariophysan interrelationships – a comprehensive review". Science Publishers and Taylor & Francis (Oxford, UK). 592 pages.
- ARRATIA, G., B.G. KAPOOR, M. CHARDON & R. DIOGO (2003). "Catfishes". Science Publishers (Enfield, US). 812 pages.

== Most relevant talks/science divulgation articles ==
TED talk on Human Behavior & Sexuality. TEDx Porto, April 2, 2022. https://www.ted.com/talks/rui_diogo_monogamia_poligamia_poliamoria_o_que_e_natural

The Conversation - https://theconversation.com/racist-and-sexist-depictions-of-human-evolution-still-permeate-science-education-and-popular-culture-today-202011

Sapiens - https://www.sapiens.org/biology/human-mating-relationships/
