= Extended evolutionary synthesis =

Set of theoretical concepts concerning evolutionary biology

The Extended Evolutionary Synthesis (EES) consists of a set of theoretical concepts argued to be more comprehensive than the earlier modern synthesis of evolutionary biology that took place between 1918 and 1942. The extended evolutionary synthesis was called for in the 1950s by C. H. Waddington, argued for on the basis of punctuated equilibrium by Stephen Jay Gould and Niles Eldredge in the 1980s, and was reconceptualized in 2007 by Massimo Pigliucci and Gerd B. Müller.

The extended evolutionary synthesis revisits the relative importance of different factors at play, examining several assumptions of the earlier synthesis, and augmenting it with additional causative factors. It includes multilevel selection, transgenerational epigenetic inheritance, niche construction, evolvability, and several concepts from evolutionary developmental biology.

Not all biologists have agreed on the need for, or the scope of, an extended synthesis. Many have collaborated on another synthesis in evolutionary developmental biology, which concentrates on developmental molecular genetics and evolution to understand how natural selection operated on developmental processes and deep homologies between organisms at the level of highly conserved genes.

== The preceding "modern synthesis" ==
Several major ideas about evolution came together in the population genetics of the early 20th century to form the modern synthesis, including genetic variation, natural selection, and particulate (Mendelian) inheritance. This ended the eclipse of Darwinism and supplanted a variety of non-Darwinian theories of evolution. However, it did not unify all of biology, omitting sciences such as developmental biology.

The modern synthesis was the widely accepted early-20th-century synthesis reconciling Charles Darwin's theory of evolution by natural selection and Gregor Mendel's theory of genetics in a joint mathematical framework. It established evolution as biology's central paradigm. The 19th-century ideas of natural selection by Darwin and Mendelian genetics were united by researchers who included Ronald Fisher, J. B. S. Haldane and Sewall Wright, the three founders of population genetics, between 1918 and 1932. Julian Huxley introduced the phrase "modern synthesis" in his 1942 book, Evolution: The Modern Synthesis.

== Early history ==
During the 1950s, English biologist C. H. Waddington called for an extended synthesis based on his research on epigenetics and genetic assimilation.

In 1978, Michael J. D. White wrote about an extension of the modern synthesis based on new research from speciation. In the 1980s, entomologist Ryuichi Matsuda coined the term "pan-environmentalism" as an extended evolutionary synthesis which he saw as a fusion of Darwinism with neo-Lamarckism. He held that heterochrony is a main mechanism for evolutionary change and that novelty in evolution can be generated by genetic assimilation. An extended synthesis was also proposed by the Austrian zoologist Rupert Riedl, with the study of evolvability.

Gordon Rattray Taylor in his 1983 book The Great Evolution Mystery called for an extended synthesis, noting that the modern synthesis is only a subsection of a more comprehensive explanation for biological evolution still to be formulated. In 1985, biologist Robert G. B. Reid authored Evolutionary Theory: The Unfinished Synthesis, which argued that the modern synthesis with its emphasis on natural selection is an incomplete picture of evolution, and emergent evolution can explain the origin of genetic variation.

In 1988, ethologist John Endler wrote about developing a newer synthesis, discussing processes of evolution that he felt had been neglected.

In 2000, Robert L. Carroll called for an "expanded evolutionary synthesis" due to new research from molecular developmental biology, systematics, geology and the fossil record.

== Punctuated equilibrium ==
In the 1980s, the American palaeontologists Stephen Jay Gould and Niles Eldredge argued for an extended synthesis based on their idea of punctuated equilibrium, the role of species selection shaping large scale evolutionary patterns and natural selection working on multiple levels extending from genes to species.

== Contributions from evolutionary developmental biology ==
Some researchers in the field of evolutionary developmental biology proposed another synthesis. They argue that the modern and extended syntheses should mostly center on genes and suggest an integration of embryology with molecular genetics and evolution, aiming to understand how natural selection operates on gene regulation and deep homologies between organisms at the level of highly conserved genes, transcription factors and signalling pathways. By contrast, a different strand of evo-devo following an organismal approach contributes to the extended synthesis by emphasizing (amongst others) developmental bias (both through facilitation and constraint), evolvability, and inherency of form as primary factors in the evolution of complex structures and phenotypic novelties.

== Recent history ==
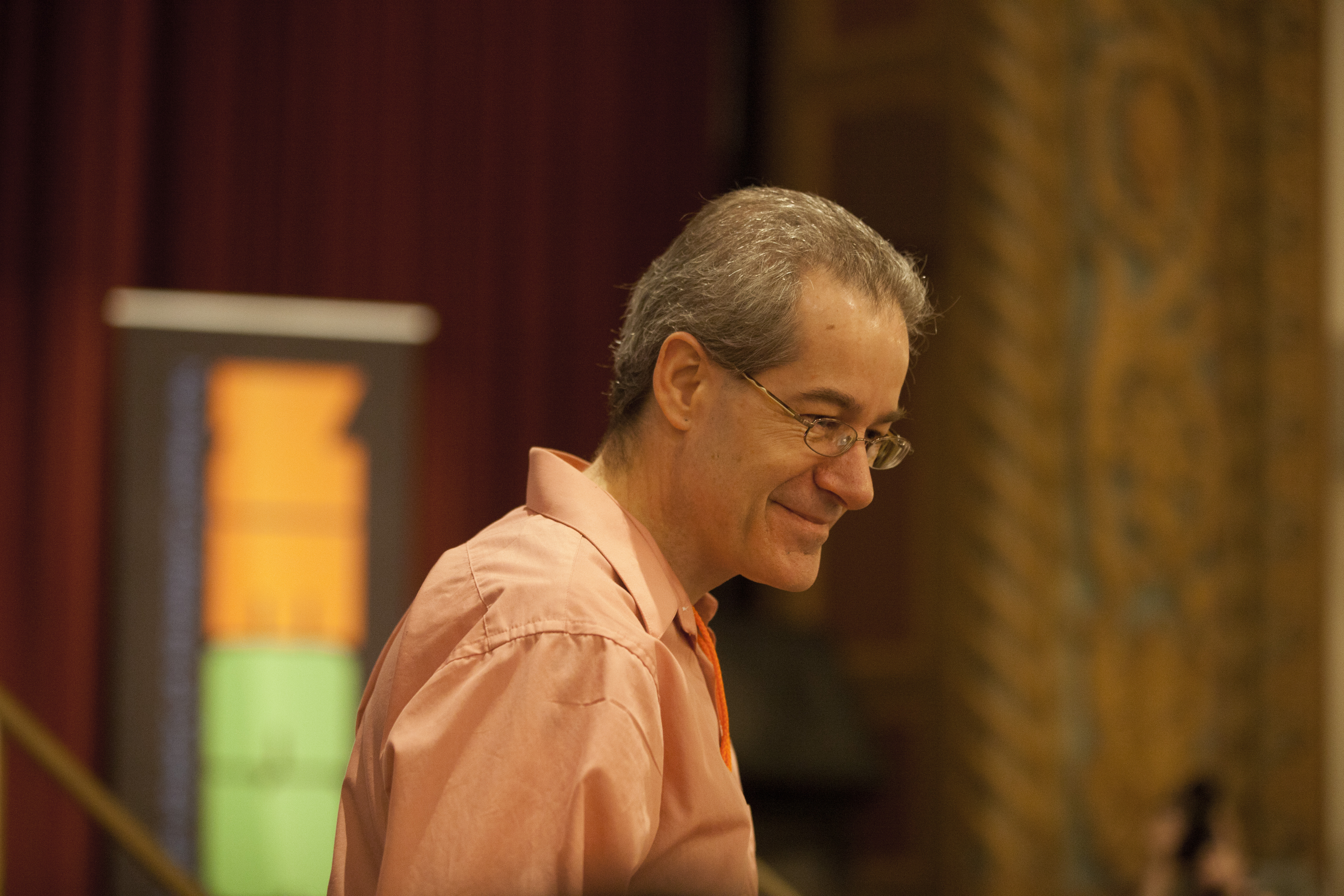
Massimo Pigliucci, a leading proponent of the extended evolutionary synthesis in its 2007 form

The idea of an extended synthesis was relaunched in 2007 by Massimo Pigliucci, and Gerd B. Müller, with a book in 2010 titled Evolution: The Extended Synthesis, which has served as a launching point for work on the extended synthesis. This includes:

- The role of prior configurations, genomic structures, and other traits in the organism in generating evolutionary variations.
- How increasing dimensionality of fitness landscapes affects our view of speciation.
- The role of multilevel selection in the major evolutionary transitions.
- New types of inheritance, including cultural and epigenetic inheritance.
- The way that organismal development and developmental plasticity channel evolutionary pathways and generates phenotypic novelty
- How organisms modify the environments they belong to through niche construction.

Other processes such as evolvability, phenotypic plasticity, reticulate evolution, horizontal gene transfer, symbiogenesis are said by proponents to have been excluded or missed from the modern synthesis. The goal of Piglucci's and Müller's extended synthesis is to take evolution beyond the gene-centered approach of population genetics to consider more organism- and ecology-centered approaches. Many of these causes are currently considered secondary in evolutionary causation, and proponents of the extended synthesis want them to be considered first-class evolutionary causes.

Michael R. Rose and Todd Oakley have called for a postmodern synthesis, they commented that "it is now abundantly clear that living things often attain a degree of genomic complexity far beyond simple models like the "gene library" genome of the Modern Synthesis". Biologist Eugene Koonin has suggested that the gradualism of the modern synthesis is unsustainable as gene duplication, horizontal gene transfer and endosymbiosis play a pivotal role in evolution. Koonin commented that "the new developments in evolutionary biology by no account should be viewed as refutation of Darwin. On the contrary, they are widening the trails that Darwin blazed 150 years ago and reveal the extraordinary fertility of his thinking."

Arlin Stoltzfus and colleagues advocate mutational and developmental bias in the introduction of variation as an important source of orientation or direction in evolutionary change. They argue that bias in the introduction of variation was not formally recognized throughout the 20th century, due to the influence of neo-Darwinism on thinking about causation.

=== Organism-centered evolution ===
The early biologists of the organicist movement have influenced the modern extended evolutionary synthesis. Recent research has called for expanding the population genetic framework of evolutionary biology by a more organism-centered perspective. This has been described as "organism-centered evolution" which looks beyond the genome to the ways that individual organisms are participants in their own evolution. Philip Ball has written a research review on organism-centered evolution.

In her book from 2003, Developmental Plasticity and Evolution, Mary Jane West-Eberhard showed that biological theory cannot make sense of evolution if it lacks a theory of the phenotype. Only when we have understood the phenotype and its responsiveness to the environment (or phenotypic plasticity), she says, can we understand its development, selection, and evolution—and the place of genes therein: 'Why start with the phenotype and its development? Because that is where evolution starts.' Likewise, development itself depends at every step 'on the pre-existent structure of the phenotype.' Crucially for West-Eberhard, like Darwin before her, phenotypic plasticity includes the agency of organisms (as well as ontogenetic and epigenetic flexibility) because it is as agents that organisms participate in the struggle for existence from which natural selection results: "genes are usually followers, not leaders, in evolutionary change."

Rui Diogo has proposed a revision of evolutionary theory, which he has termed ONCE: Organic Nonoptimal Constrained Evolution. According to ONCE, evolution is mainly driven by the behavioural choices and persistence of organisms themselves, whilst natural selection plays a secondary role. ONCE cites examples of reciprocal causation between organism and the environment, Baldwin effect, organic selection, developmental bias and niche construction.

=== Predictions ===
The extended synthesis is characterized by its additional set of predictions that differ from the standard modern synthesis theory:

1. Change in phenotype can precede change in genotype
2. Changes in phenotype are predominantly positive, rather than neutral (see: neutral theory of molecular evolution)
3. Changes in phenotype are induced in many organisms, rather than one organism
4. Revolutionary change in phenotype can occur through mutation, facilitated variation or threshold events
5. Repeated evolution in isolated populations can be by convergent evolution or developmental bias
6. Adaptation can be caused by natural selection, environmental induction, non-genetic inheritance, learning and cultural transmission (see: Baldwin effect, meme, transgenerational epigenetic inheritance, ecological inheritance, non-Mendelian inheritance)
7. Rapid evolution can result from simultaneous induction, natural selection and developmental dynamics
8. Biodiversity can be affected by features of developmental systems such as differences in evolvability
9. Heritable variation is directed towards variants that are adaptive and integrated with phenotype
10. Niche construction is biased towards environmental changes that suit the constructor's phenotype, or that of its descendants, and enhance their fitness
11. Kin selection
12. Multilevel selection
13. Self-organization
14. Symbiogenesis

=== Testing ===
From 2016 to 2019, there was an organized project entitled "Putting The Extended Evolutionary Synthesis To The Test" supported by a 7.5 million USD grant from the John Templeton Foundation, supplemented with further money from participating institutions including Clark University, Indiana University, Lund University, Stanford University, University of Southampton and University of St Andrews.

Publications from the project include over 200 papers, a special issue, and an anthology on Evolutionary Causation. In 2019 a final report of the 2016–2019 consortium was published, Putting the Extended Evolutionary Synthesis to the Test.

The project was headed by Kevin N. Laland at the University of St Andrews and Tobias Uller at Lund University. According to Laland what the extended synthesis "really boils down to is recognition that, in addition to selection, drift, mutation and other established evolutionary processes, other factors, particularly developmental influences, shape the evolutionary process in important ways."

== Status ==
Biologists disagree on the need for an extended synthesis. Opponents contend that the modern synthesis is able to fully account for the newer observations, whereas others criticize the extended synthesis for not being radical enough. Proponents think that the conceptions of evolution at the core of the modern synthesis are too narrow and that even when the modern synthesis allows for the ideas in the extended synthesis, using the modern synthesis affects the way that biologists think about evolution. For example, Denis Noble says that using terms and categories of the modern synthesis distorts the picture of biology that modern experimentation has discovered. Proponents therefore claim that the extended synthesis is necessary to help expand the conceptions and framework of how evolution is considered throughout the biological disciplines. In 2022, the John Templeton Foundation published a review of recent literature.
