= Niche construction =

Process by which an organism shapes its environment

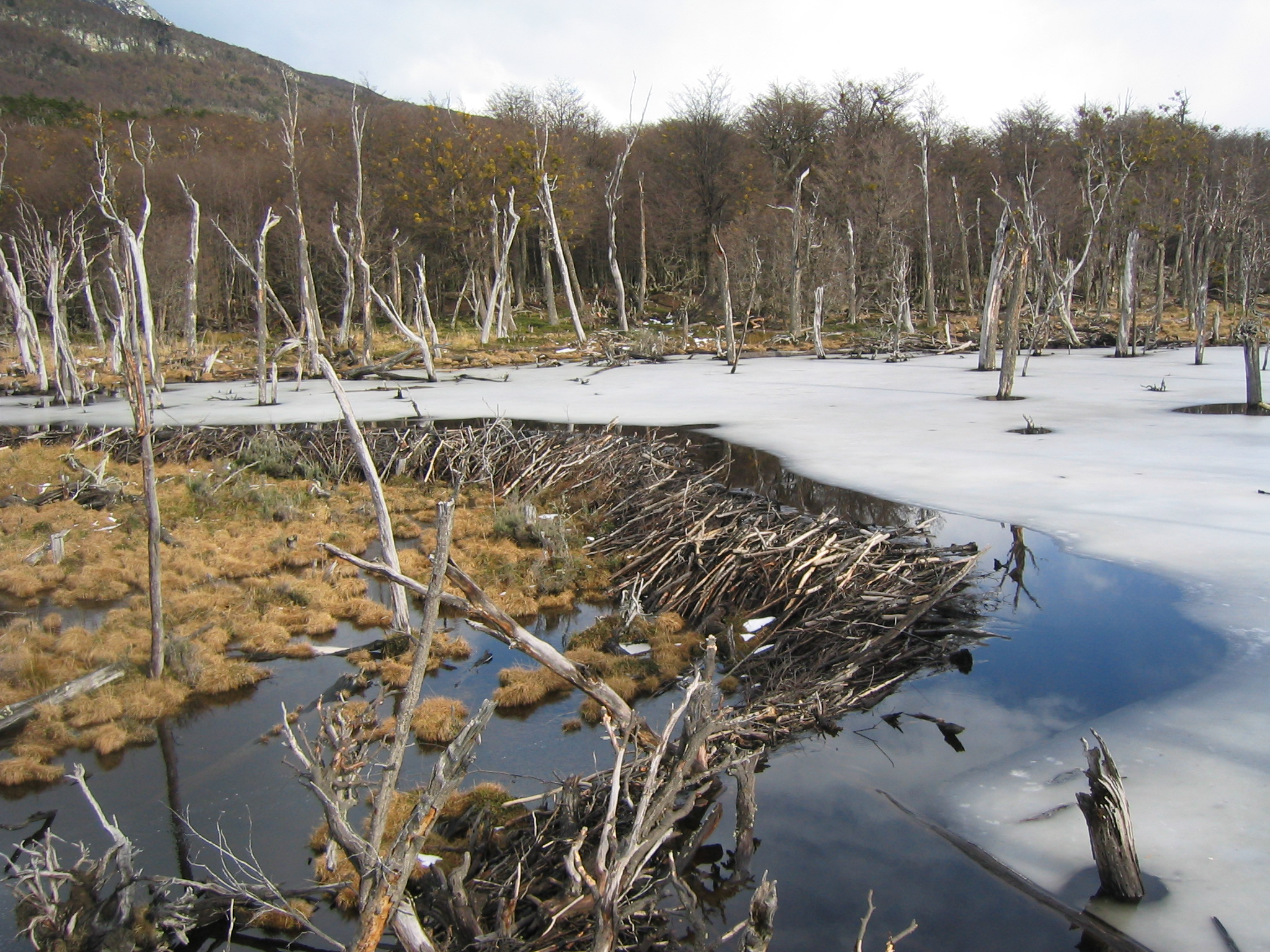
Beavers hold a very specific biological niche in the ecosystem: constructing dams across river systems.

Niche construction is the ecological process by which an organism alters its own (or another species') local environment. These alterations can be a physical change to the organism's environment, or it can encompass the active movement of an organism from one habitat to another where it then experiences different environmental pressures. Examples of niche construction include the building of nests and burrows by animals, the creation of shade, the influencing of wind speed, and alternations to nutrient cycling by plants. Although these modifications are often directly beneficial to the constructor, they are not necessarily always. For example, when organisms dump detritus, they can degrade their own local environments. Within some biological evolutionary frameworks, niche construction can actively beget processes pertaining to ecological inheritance whereby the organism in question "constructs" new or unique ecologic, and perhaps even sociologic environmental realities characterized by specific selective pressures.

== Evolution ==
For niche construction to affect evolution it must satisfy three criteria: 1) the organism must significantly modify environmental conditions, 2) these modifications must influence one or more selection pressures on a recipient organism, and 3) there must be an evolutionary response in at least one recipient population caused by the environmental modification. The first two criteria alone provide evidence of niche construction.

Recently, some biologists have argued that niche construction is an evolutionary process that works in conjunction with natural selection. Evolution entails networks of feedbacks in which previously selected organisms drive environmental changes, and organism-modified environments subsequently select for changes in organisms. The complementary match between an organism and its environment results from the two processes of natural selection and niche construction. The effect of niche construction is especially pronounced in situations where environmental alterations persist for several generations, introducing the evolutionary role of ecological inheritance. This theory emphasizes that organisms inherit two legacies from their ancestors: genes and a modified environment. A niche constructing organism may or may not be considered an ecosystem engineer. Ecosystem engineering is a related but non-evolutionary concept referring to structural changes brought about in the environment by organisms.

== Examples ==
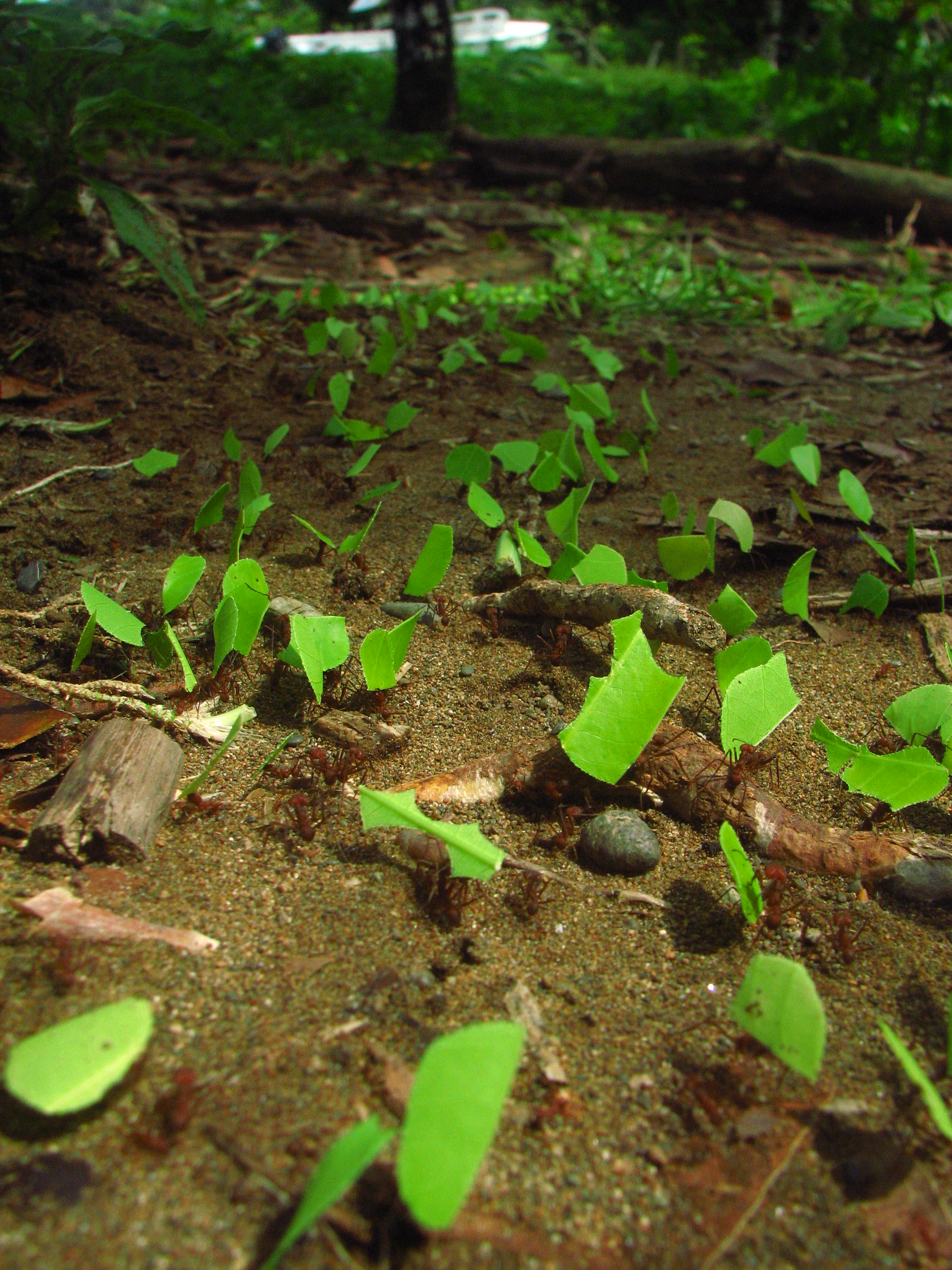
Leafcutter ants fill a vital niche in the rainforest ecosystem

The following are some examples of niche construction:

- Earthworms physically and chemically modify the soil in which they live. Only by changing the soil can these primarily aquatic organisms live on land. Earthworm soil processing benefits plant species and other biota present in the soil, as originally pointed out by Darwin in his book The Formation of Vegetable Mould through the Action of Worms.
- Lemon ants (Myrmelachista schumanni) employ a specialized method of suppression that regulates the growth of certain trees. They live in the trunks of Duroia hirsuta trees found in the Amazonian rain forest of Peru. Lemon ants use formic acid (a chemical fairly common among species of ants) as a herbicide. By eliminating trees unsuitable for lemon ant colonies, these ants produce distinctive habitats known as Devil's gardens.
- Beavers build dams and thereby create lakes that drastically shape and alter riparian ecosystems. These activities modify nutrient cycling and decomposition dynamics, influence the water and materials transported downstream, and ultimately influence plant and community composition and diversity.
- Benthic diatoms living in estuarine sediments in the Bay of Fundy, Canada, secrete carbohydrate exudates that bind the sand and stabilize the environment. This changes the physical state of the sand which allows other organisms (such as the amphipod Corophium volutator) to colonize the area.
- Chaparrals and pines increase the frequency of forest fire through the dispersal of needles, cones, seeds and oils, essentially littering the forest floor. The benefit of this activity is facilitated by an adaptation for fire resistance which benefits them relative to their competitors.
- Saccharomyces cerevisiae yeast creates a novel environment out of fermenting fruit. This fermentation process in turn attracts fruit flies that it is closely associated with and utilizes for transportation.
- Cyanobacteria provide an example on a planetary scale through the production of oxygen as a waste product of photosynthesis (see Great Oxygenation Event). This dramatically changed the composition of the Earth's atmosphere and oceans, with vast macroevolutionary and ecological consequences.
- Microbialites represent ancient niches constructed by bacterial communities which give evidence that niche construction was present on early life forms.

== Consequences ==
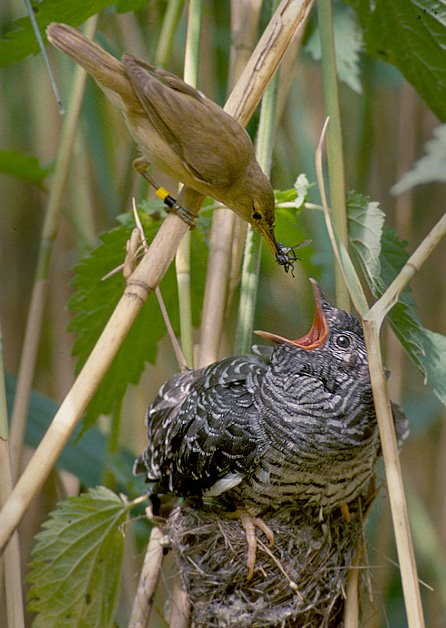
A Reed Warbler feeding its large, infant intruder.

As creatures construct new niches, they can have a significant effect on the world around them.

- An important consequence of niche construction is that it can affect the natural selection experienced by the species doing the constructing. The common cuckoo illustrates such a consequence. It parasitizes other birds by laying its eggs in their nests. This had led to several adaptations among the cuckoos, including a short incubation time for their eggs. The eggs need to hatch first so that the chick can push the host's eggs out of the nest, ensuring it has no competition for the parents' attention. Another adaptation it has acquired is that the chick mimics the calls of multiple young chicks, so that the parents are bringing in food not just for one offspring, but a whole brood.
- Niche construction can also generate co-evolutionary interactions, as illustrated by the above earthworm, beaver and yeast examples.
- The development of many organisms, and the recurrence of traits across generations, has been found to depend critically on the construction of developmental environments such as nests by ancestral organisms. Ecological inheritance refers to the inherited resources and conditions, and associated modified selection pressures, that ancestral organisms bequeath to their descendants as a direct result of their niche construction.
- Niche construction has important implications for understanding, managing, and conserving ecosystems.

== History ==
Niche construction theory (NCT) has been anticipated by diverse people in the past, including by the physicist Erwin Schrödinger in his What Is Life? and Mind and Matter essays (1944). An early advocate of the niche construction perspective in biology was the developmental biologist, Conrad Waddington. He drew his attention to the many ways in which animals modify their selective environments throughout their lives, by choosing and changing their environmental conditions, a phenomenon that he termed "the exploitive system".

The niche construction perspective was subsequently brought to prominence through the writings of Harvard evolutionary biologist, Richard Lewontin. In the 1970s and 1980s Lewontin wrote a series of articles on adaptation, in which he pointed out that organisms do not passively adapt through selection to pre-existing conditions, but actively construct important components of their niches.

Oxford biologist John Odling-Smee (1988) was the first person to coin the term 'niche construction', and the first to make the argument that 'niche construction' and 'ecological inheritance' should be recognized as evolutionary processes. Over the next decade research into niche construction increased rapidly, with a rush of experimental and theoretical studies across a broad range of fields.

== Modeling niche construction ==
Niche Construction in Evolutionary Time. The organism both changes its environment and adapts to it.

Mathematical evolutionary theory explores both the evolution of niche construction, and its evolutionary and ecological consequences. These analyses suggest that niche construction is of considerable importance. For instance, niche construction can:

- fix genes or phenotypes that would otherwise be deleterious, create or eliminate equilibria, and affect evolutionary rates;
- cause evolutionary time lags, generate momentum, inertia, autocatalytic effects, catastrophic responses to selection, and cyclical dynamics;
- drive niche-constructing traits to fixation by creating statistical associations with recipient traits;
- facilitate the evolution of cooperation;
- regulate environmental states, allowing persistence in otherwise inhospitable conditions, facilitating range expansion and affecting carrying capacities;
- drive coevolutionary events, exacerbate and ameliorate competition, affect the likelihood of coexistence and produce macroevolutionary trends.

== Humans ==
Niche construction theory has had a particular impact in the human sciences, including biological anthropology, archaeology, and psychology. Niche construction is now recognized to have played important roles in human evolution, including the evolution of cognitive capabilities. Its impact is probably because it is immediately apparent that humans possess an unusually potent capability to regulate, construct and destroy their environments, and that this is generating some pressing current problems (e.g. climate change, deforestation, urbanization). However, human scientists have been attracted to the niche construction perspective because it recognizes human activities as a directing process, rather than merely the consequence of natural selection. Cultural niche construction can also feed back to affect other cultural processes, even affecting genetics.

Niche construction theory emphasizes how acquired characters play an evolutionary role, through transforming selective environments. This is particularly relevant to human evolution, where our species appears to have engaged in extensive environmental modification through cultural practices. Such cultural practices are typically not themselves biological adaptations (rather, they are the adaptive product of those much more general adaptations, such as the ability to learn, particularly from others, to teach, to use language, and so forth, that underlie human culture).

Mathematical models have established that cultural niche construction can modify natural selection on human genes and drive evolutionary events. This interaction is known as gene-culture coevolution. There is now little doubt that human cultural niche construction has co-directed human evolution. Humans have modified selection, for instance, by dispersing into new environments with different climatic regimes, devising agricultural practices or domesticating livestock. A well-researched example is the finding that dairy farming created the selection pressure that led to the spread of alleles for adult lactase persistence. Analyses of the human genome have identified many hundreds of genes subject to recent selection, and human cultural activities are thought to be a major source of selection in many cases. The lactase persistence example may be representative of a very general pattern of gene-culture coevolution.

Niche construction is also now central to several accounts of how language evolved. For instance, Derek Bickerton describes how our ancestors constructed scavenging niches that required them to communicate in order to recruit sufficient individuals to drive off predators away from megafauna corpses. He maintains that our use of language, in turn, created a new niche in which sophisticated cognition was beneficial.

== Current status ==
While the fact that niche construction occurs is non-contentious, and its study goes back to Darwin's classic books on earthworms and corals, the evolutionary consequences of niche construction have not always been fully appreciated. Researchers differ over to what extent niche construction requires changes in understanding of the evolutionary process. Many advocates of the niche-construction perspective align themselves with other progressive elements in seeking an extended evolutionary synthesis, a stance that other prominent evolutionary biologists reject. Laubichler and Renn argue that niche construction theory offers the prospect of a broader synthesis of evolutionary phenomena through "the notion of expanded and multiple inheritance systems (from genomic to ecological, social and cultural)."

Niche construction theory (NCT) remains controversial, particularly amongst orthodox evolutionary biologists. In particular, the claim that niche construction is an evolutionary process has excited controversy. A collaboration between some critics of the niche-construction perspective and one of its advocates attempted to pinpoint their differences. They wrote:

"NCT argues that niche construction is a distinct evolutionary process, potentially of equal importance to natural selection. The skeptics dispute this. For them, evolutionary processes are processes that change gene frequencies, of which they identify four (natural selection, genetic drift, mutation, migration [ie. gene flow])... They do not see how niche construction either generates or sorts genetic variation independently of these other processes, or how it changes gene frequencies in any other way. In contrast, NCT adopts a broader notion of an evolutionary process, one that it shares with some other evolutionary biologists. Although the advocate agrees that there is a useful distinction to be made between processes that modify gene frequencies directly, and factors that play different roles in evolution... The skeptics probably represent the majority position: evolutionary processes are those that change gene frequencies. Advocates of NCT, in contrast, are part of a sizable minority of evolutionary biologists that conceive of evolutionary processes more broadly, as anything that systematically biases the direction or rate of evolution, a criterion that they (but not the skeptics) feel niche construction meets."

The authors conclude that their disagreements reflect a wider dispute within evolutionary theory over whether the modern synthesis is in need of reformulation, as well as different usages of some key terms (e.g., evolutionary process).

Further controversy surrounds the application of niche construction theory to the origins of agriculture within archaeology. In a 2015 review, archaeologist Bruce Smith concluded: "Explanations [for domestication of plants and animals] based on diet breadth modeling are found to have a number of conceptual, theoretical, and methodological flaws; approaches based on niche construction theory are far better supported by the available evidence in the two regions considered [eastern North America and the Neotropics]". However, other researchers see no conflict between niche construction theory and the application of behavioral ecology methods in archaeology.

A critical review by Manan Gupta and colleagues was published in 2017 which led to a dispute amongst critics and proponents.

In 2018 another review updates the importance of niche construction and extragenetic adaptation in evolutionary processes.

== See also ==
- Nest-building in primates
- Person–environment fit
- Structures built by animals
