= Structures built by animals =

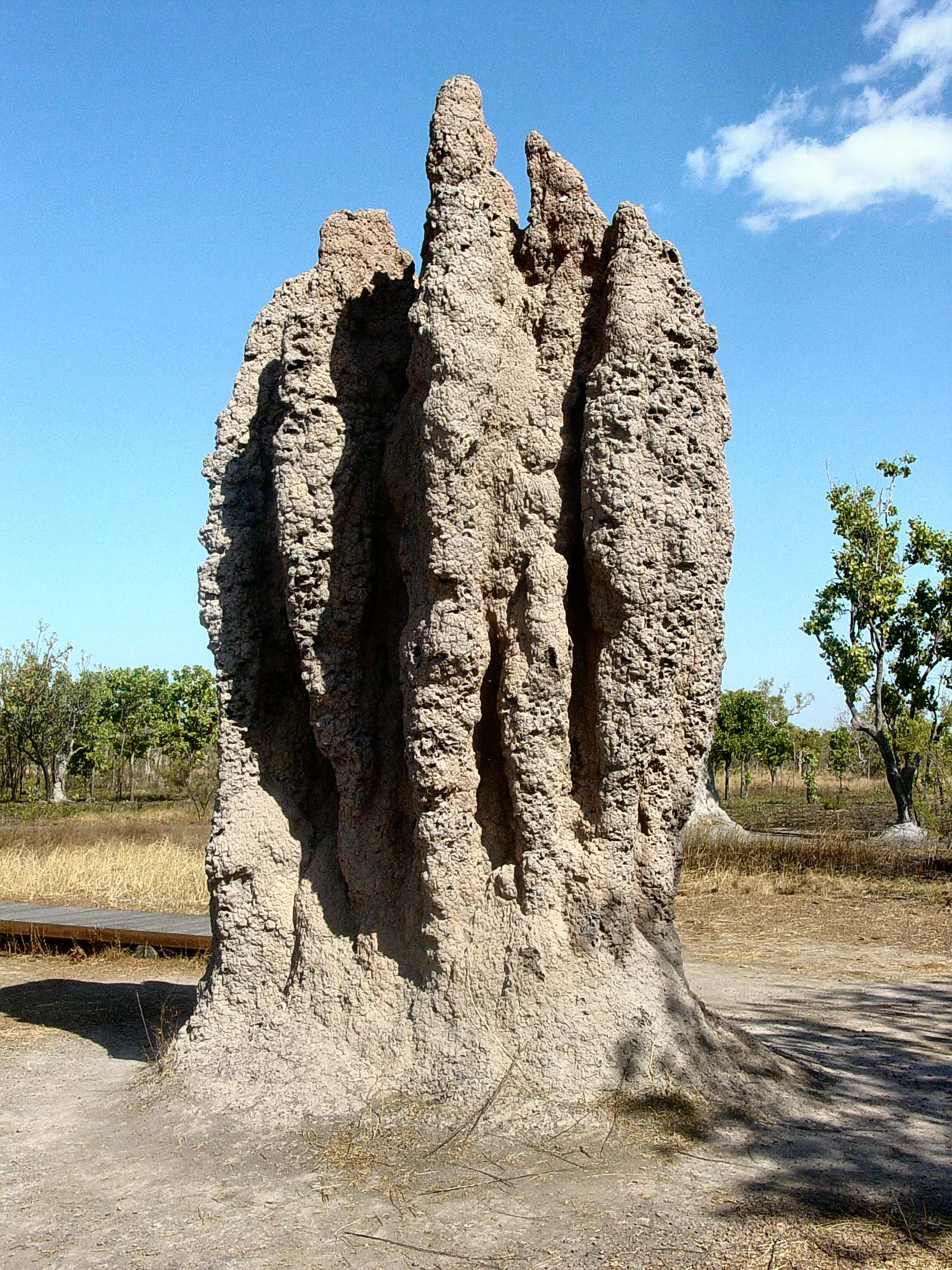
A so-called "cathedral" mound produced by a termite colony

Structures built by non-human animals, often called animal architecture, are common in many species. Examples of animal structures include termite mounds, ant hills, wasp and beehives, burrow complexes, beaver dams, elaborate nests of birds, and webs of spiders.

Often, these structures incorporate sophisticated features such as temperature regulation, traps, bait, ventilation, special-purpose chambers and many other features. They may be created by individuals or complex societies of social animals with different forms carrying out specialized roles. These constructions may arise from complex building behaviour of animals such as in the case of night-time nests for chimpanzees, from inbuilt neural responses, which feature prominently in the construction of bird songs, or triggered by hormone release as in the case of domestic sows, or as emergent properties from simple instinctive responses and interactions, as exhibited by termites, or combinations of these. The process of building such structures may involve learning and communication, and in some cases, even aesthetics. Tool use may also be involved in building structures by animals.

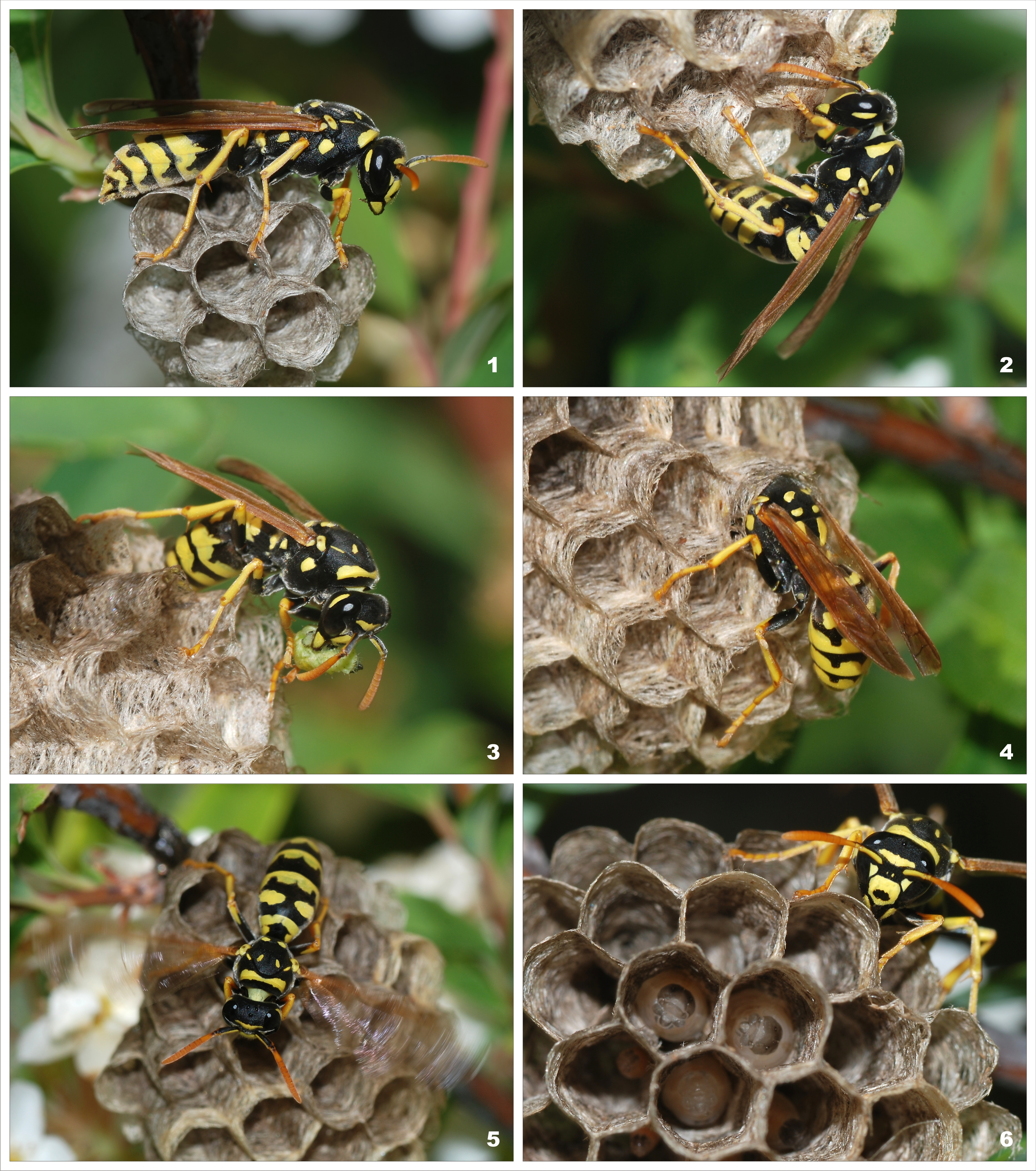
A young paper wasp queen (Polistes dominula) starting a new colony

Building behaviour is common in many non-human mammals, birds, insects and arachnids. It is also seen in a few species of fish, reptiles, amphibians, molluscs, urochordates, crustaceans, annelids and some other arthropods. It is virtually absent from all the other animal phyla.

== Functions ==
Animals create structures primarily for three reasons:

- to create protected habitats, i.e. homes.
- to catch prey and for foraging, i.e. traps.
- for communication between members of the species (intra-specific communication), i.e. display.

Animals primarily build habitat for protection from extreme temperatures and from predation. Constructed structures raise physical problems which need to be resolved, such as humidity control or ventilation, which increases the complexity of the structure. Over time, through evolution, animals use shelters for other purposes such as reproduction, food storage, etc.

=== Protected habitats ===
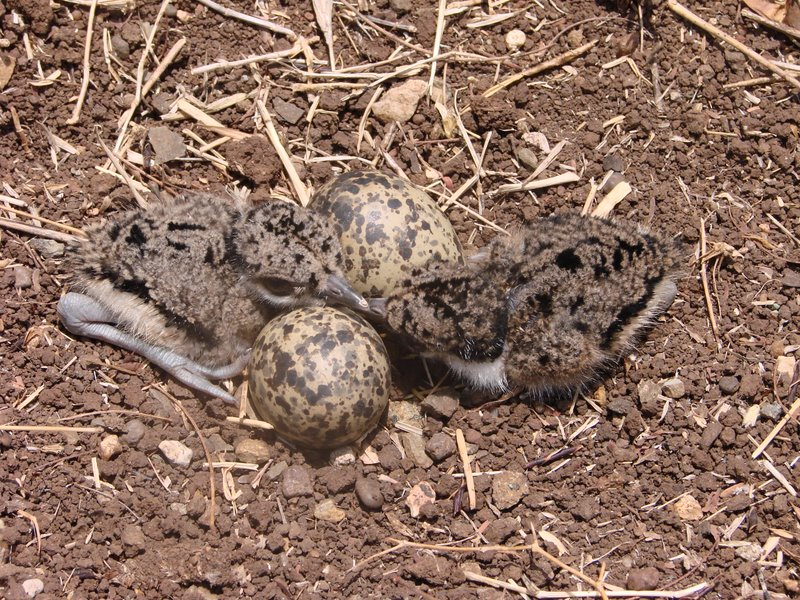
Nest, eggs and young of the red-wattled lapwing which depends upon crypsis to avoid detection of its nest

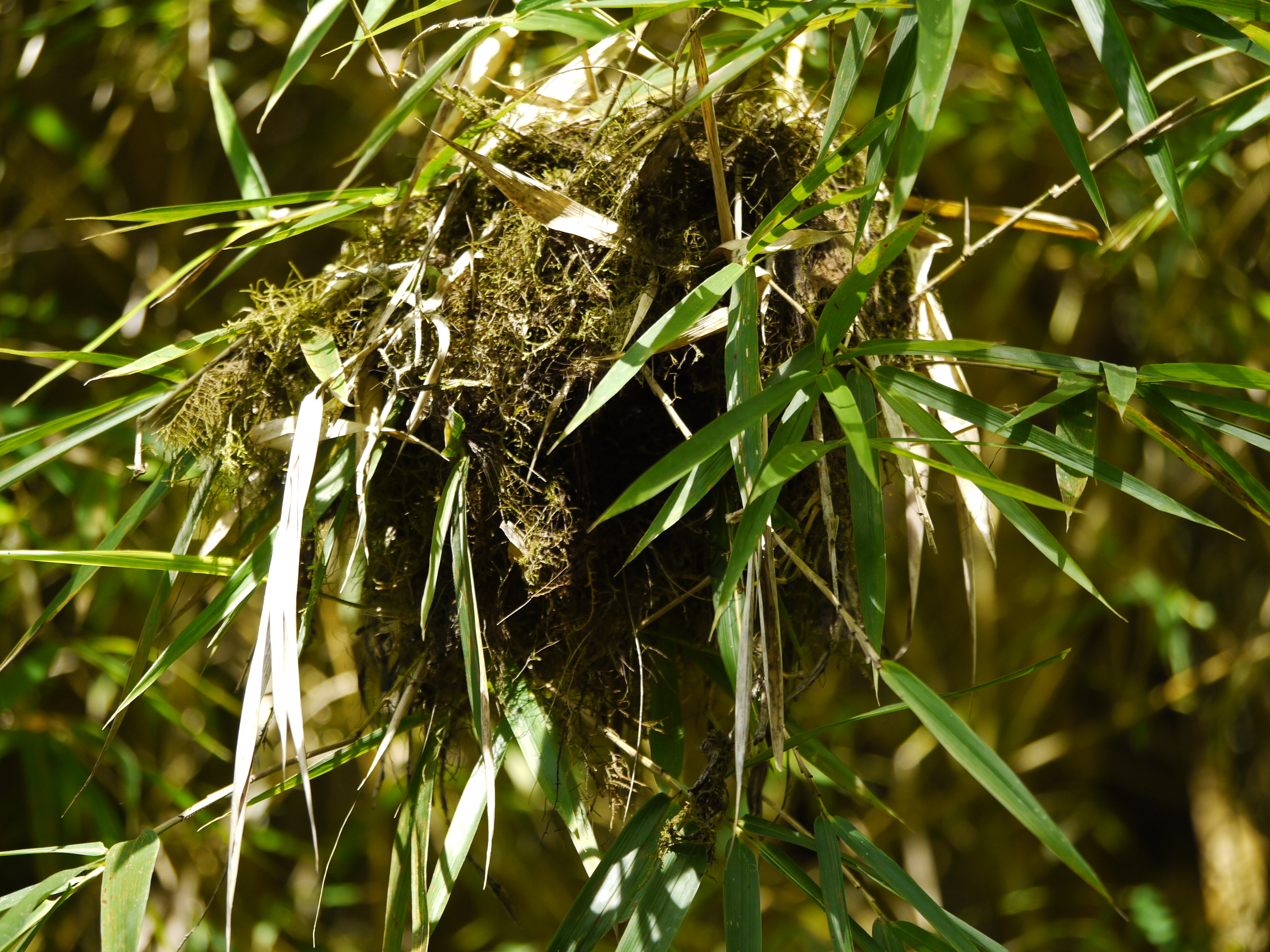
The red-faced spinetail places bits of grass and other material loosely streaming around its nest to break the shape and to masquerade as debris.

Predators are attracted to animal-built structures either by the prey or its offspring, or the stored caches of food. Structures built by animals may provide protection from predators through avoiding detection, by means such as camouflage and concealment, or through prevention of invasion, once predators have located the hideout or prey, or a combination of both. As a last resort, structures may provide means of escape.

Among the structures created by animals to prevent predation are those of the paper wasps, Polistes chinensis antennalis. The nests of these wasps contain “defensive structures”, which are formations built onto or inside of the nest to prevent predation. New nests are formed in the spring by young queens, as worker wasps have not hatched at this time. While these worker wasps are growing in the nest, they are vulnerable to predators who might rip open the nest to eat the larva. One method the queens use to prevent this is covering the developing pupae in pulp, which acts as a reinforcer and makes it more difficult from predators to break open the pupae. This pulp is a mixture of plant matter and liquids from the mouth of the queen wasp. While there are costs associated with using pulp, such as requiring time and energy to collect materials and hindering the emergence of the worker wasps from the cocoon, it does lower the risk of predation. Nests in areas with higher predation rates have been found to contain more pulp on these cocoons than nests in low predation areas.

Animals use the techniques of crypsis or camouflage, concealment, and mimicry, for avoiding detection. Some species of birds will use materials foraged from nature to camouflage their nests and prevent their offspring from being hunted. Blue–gray gnatcatchers (Polioptila caerulea) and long-tailed tits (Aegithalos caudatus) use materials such as spider webbing, silk, and lichen, while other species such as great crested flycatchers (Myiarchus crinitus) and common waxbills (Estrilda astrild) will use animal feces and snake skins to disguise their nests. Crypsis works by blending the structure with its background. The use of lichen flakes as an outer covering of nests by birds, as in the case of the paradise flycatcher (Terpsiphone paradisei) have been considered by some authors to be a case of crypsis through "branch-matching" and as a case of disruptive camouflage by the British ethologist, M. Hansell, where the lichen flakes are thought to resemble small patches of light seen through as in the case of insubstantial objects of insufficient importance to receive a predator's interest.

Ground-nesting birds which rely on crypsis for concealment have nests made from local materials which blend in with the background, the eggs and young too are cryptic; whereas birds which do not use crypsis for hiding their nests may not have cryptic eggs or young.

In a case apparently of masquerade, the red-faced spinetail Cranioleuca erythrops places bits of grass and other material loosely streaming both above and below the nest chamber to break the shape of the nest and to cause it to resemble random debris without any underlying structure.

=== Thermoregulation ===
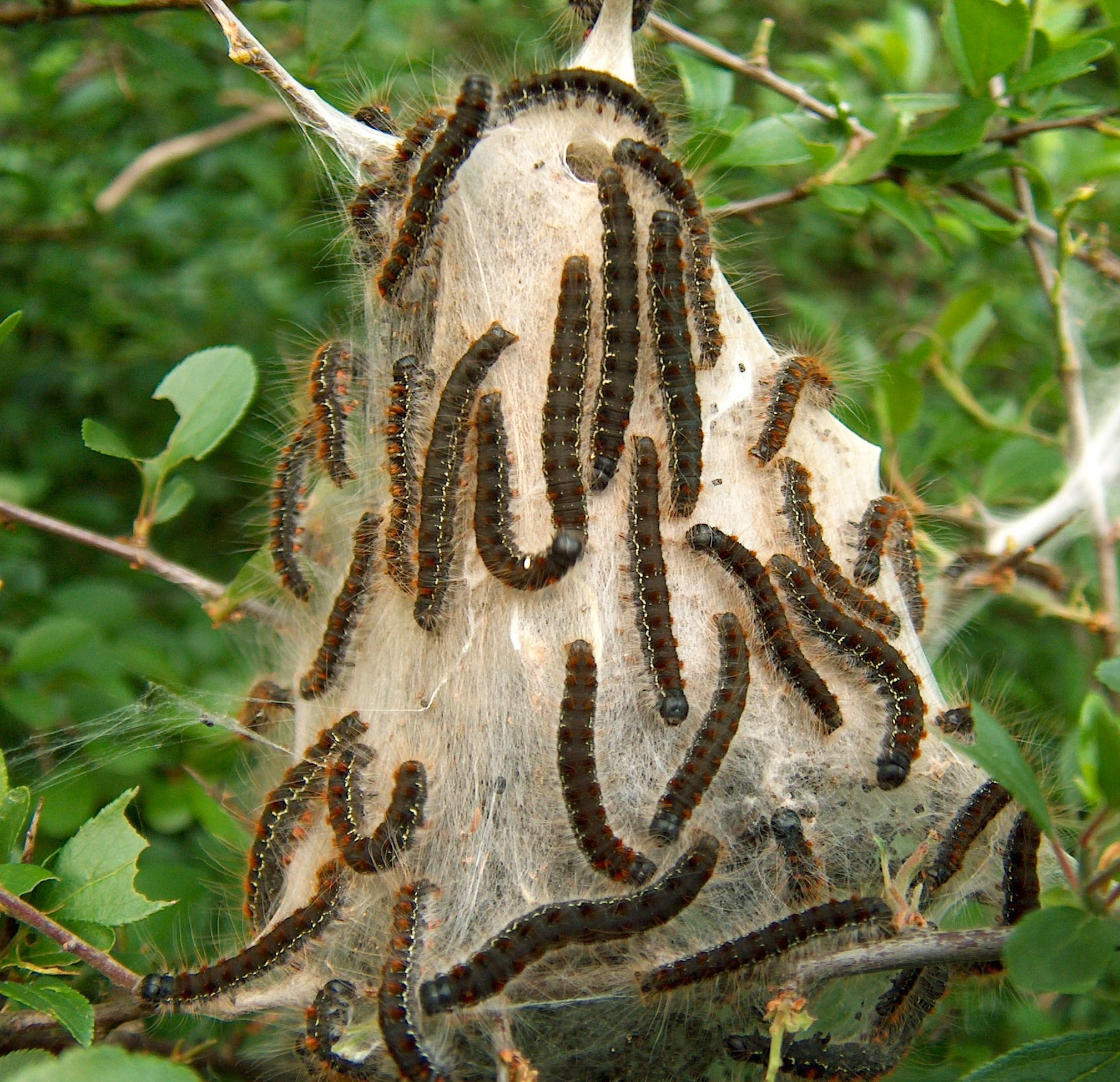
Communal silk nests of the small eggar moth Eriogaster lanestris

Temperature extremes harm animals irrespective of whether they are endothermic or ectothermic. In endothermic animals, construction of shelters, coupled with behavioural patterns, reduces the quantity and energy cost of thermoregulation, as in the case of the Arctic ground squirrels.

In ectothermic animals, moderation of temperature, along with architectural modifications to absorb, trap or dissipate energy, maximises the rate of development, as in the case of the communal silk nests of the small eggar moth Eriogaster lanestris. The primary sources of energy for an animal are the sun and its metabolism. The dynamics of heat in animal shelters is influenced by the construction material which may act as a barrier, as a heat sink or to dissipate heat. The cocoons of insect are a case in point.

An interesting example is the case of silk caps which cover the pupal cells of the Oriental hornet Vespa orientalis. Firstly, the silk insulates the pupa from the air outside the cell, and secondly, it acts as a thermostatic regulator. By virtue of its thermoelectric properties, the silk stores excess daytime heat in the form of electric charge which it releases in the form of an electric current when the temperature falls resulting in heating. Cooling is aided by evaporation of excess water from the pupal cells. When the ambient temperature drops, the silk absorbs moisture and restores the moisture content by spreading water through all parts of its cocoon.

Internal architectural devices, such as walls may block convection or the construction of air flow systems may cool the nest or habitat.

=== Trap building ===
Trap-building is a method used to catch prey instead of active hunting. Animals that snare prey will construct a trap and then wait nearby until an organism is caught. This is observed in web-building spiders, who weave elaborate webs of sticky spider silk that entangle prey. Spiders increase the size of their webs when prey are scarce, and can add extra ornamental pieces to their web in order to attract more prey. Traps can allow organisms to capture larger prey, provide protection from predators, or serve as an area for mating, as seen with spiders. Another method of trap creation is used by the antlion (Myrmeleon crudelis) larva. These larva prey on small arthropods, such as ants. The larva dig pits into fine-particle soil to capture their prey, which fall into the holes and are often unable to climb out. The antlions may alter these pits based on prey availability. In areas with less available prey, antlions will make wider holes to increase the chance of catching an insect. If prey are able to climb out of the hole, antlions will increase the depth of the hole.

=== Displays ===
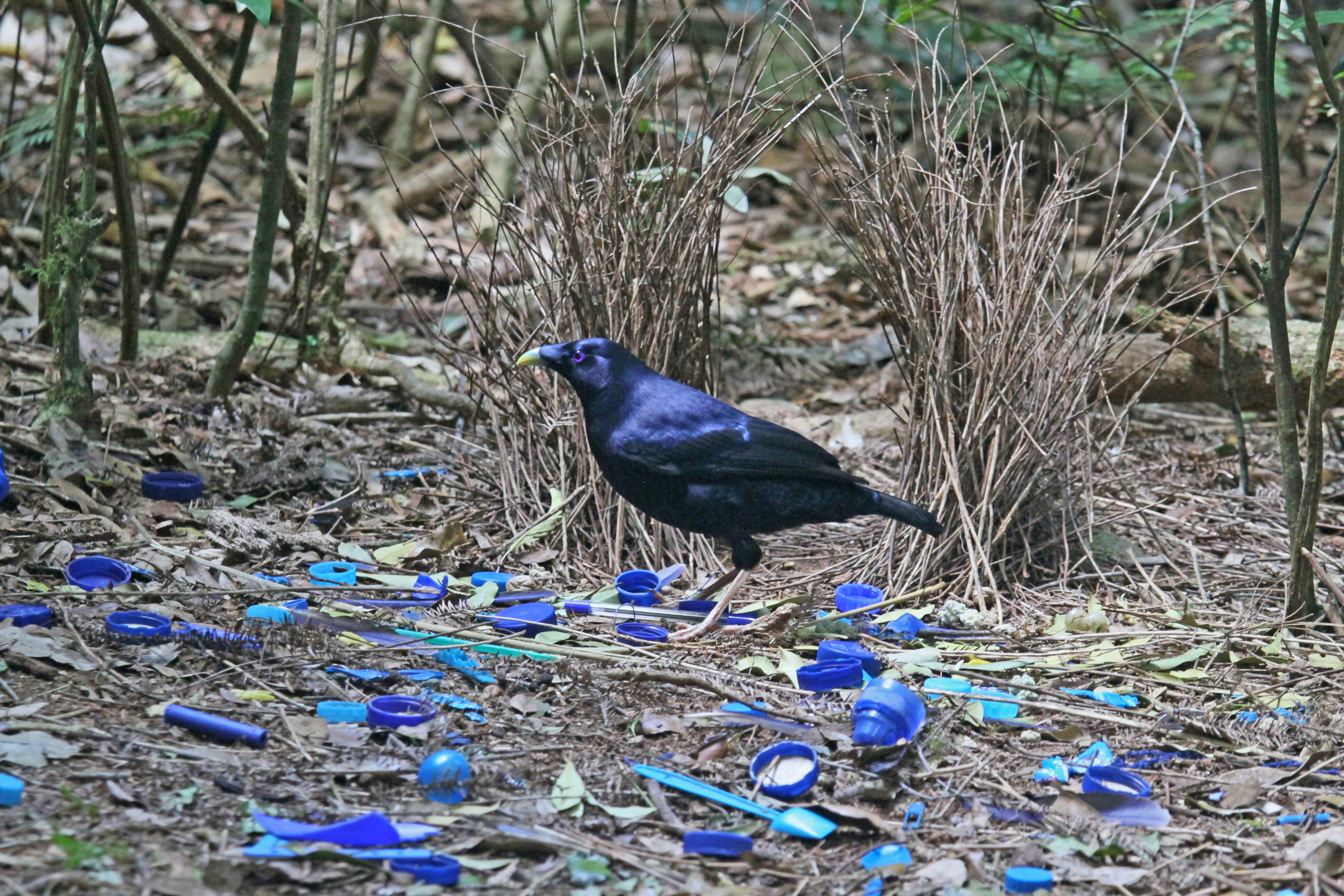
Bowerbird in front of a constructed bower

Animal structures can serve as a means of communication with other organisms. Animals may construct to attract mates, as seen in species of male fiddler crabs. These crabs may form "pillars" or "hoods" out of sand and mud to gain the attention of nearby females. Bowerbirds (Ptilonorhynchus violaceus) also create display structures to attract mates. During the mating season, male Bowerbirds will collect twigs and colourful objects to create structures known as "bowers", which attract the attention of females. Bowers that are more colourful and well constructed are more attractive to female bowerbirds, as the quality of the constructed bowers reflects the quality of the male bird.

=== Transportation ===
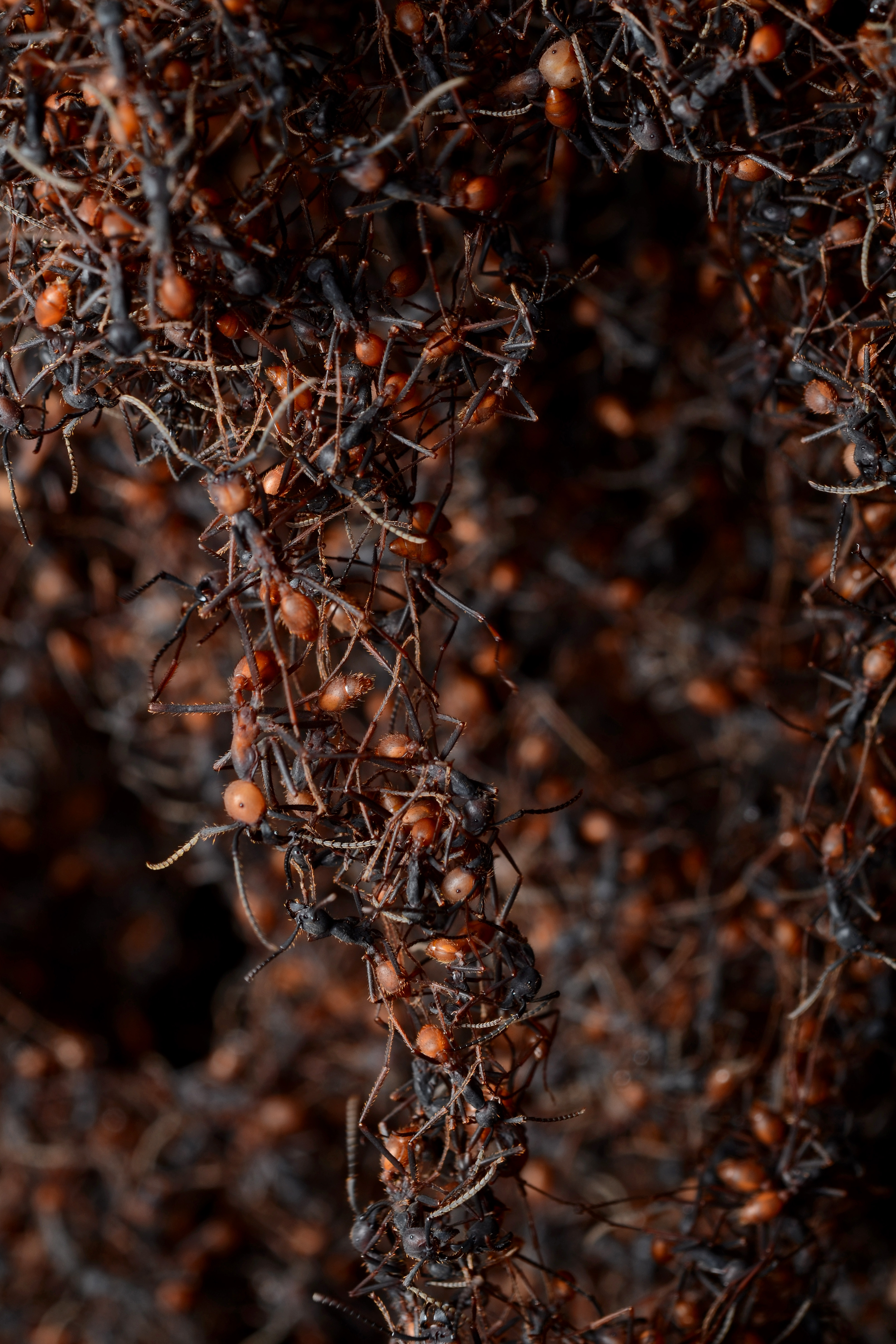
Eciton sp. forming a bridge

Army ants (Eciton hamatum) form "living bridges" to assist in transportation. Army ant colonies may move locations each day in search of food. These bridges provide a path over obstacles and allow for the ants to search for food at an increased speed. The bridges are constructed when the ants join their bodies together, and can vary in size and shape depending on the situation the ants face. Ants are confined to their position when they are forming these bridges, preventing them from moving. The bridges are broken apart when they are no longer needed.

== Building materials ==
Materials used by animals in building structures need to not only be suitable for the kind of structure to be built but also to be manipulable by the animals. These materials may be organic in nature or mineral. They may also be categorised as "collected material" and "self-secreted material".

=== Collected materials ===
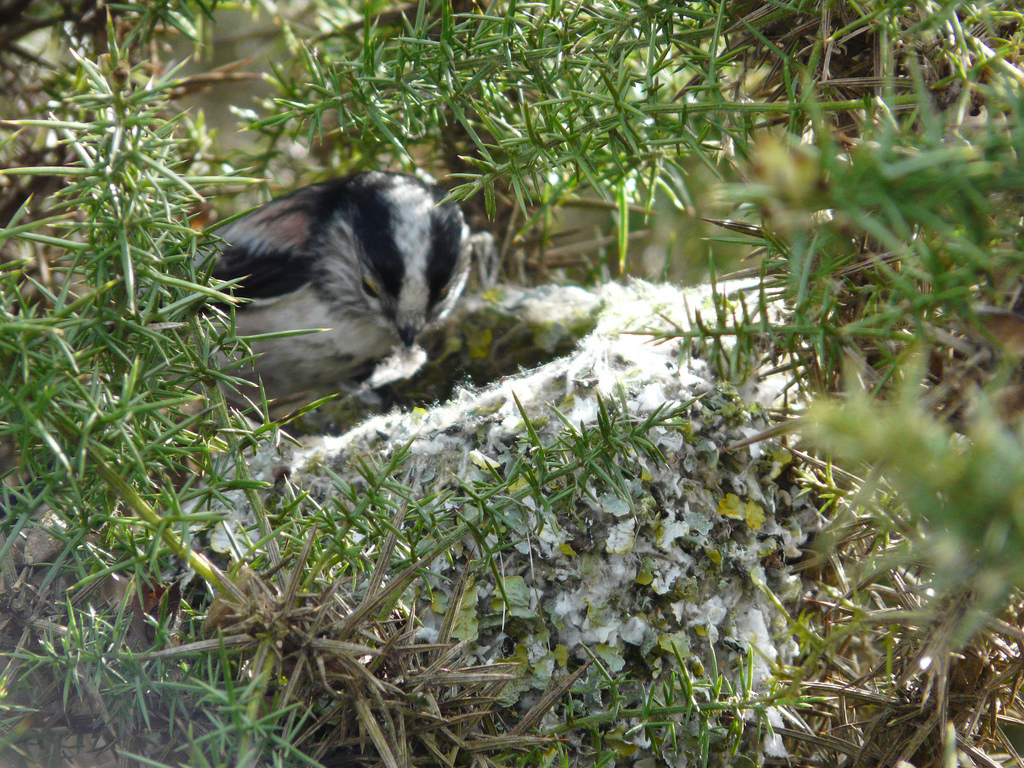
A long-tailed tit adds a feather to its nest.

Some animals collect materials with plastic properties which are used to construct and shape the nest. These include resin collected by stingless bees, mud collected by swallows and silk collected by hummingbirds.

Some materials in nature act as ready made "building blocks" to the animals in question, such as feathers and leaf petioles for some birds and animal hair for the chaffinch. Other materials need to be "processed". Caddisfly larvae use stone pieces and also cut sections from green leaves for use in construction. The stone pieces are selected as per their size and shape from a large variety. In the case of leaf sections, these are cut and shaped to required size. Similarly bagworms cut and shape thorns or twigs to form their case. Some sphecid wasps collect mud and blend them with water to construct free standing nests of mud. Paper wasp queens build with paper pulp which they prepare by rasping wood with their jaws and mixing with saliva, a case of collecting, processing and blending raw materials.

An animal builder may collect a variety of materials and use them in complex ways to form useful habitat. The nest of the long-tailed tit, Aegithalos caudatus, is constructed from four materials – lichen, feathers, spider egg cocoons and moss, over 6000 pieces in all for a typical nest. The nest is a flexible sac with a small, round entrance on top, suspended low in a gorse or bramble bush. The structural stability of the nest is provided by a mesh of moss and spider silk. The tiny leaves of the moss act as hooks and the spider silk of egg cocoons provides the loops; thus forming a natural form of velcro. The tit lines the outside with hundreds of flakes of pale lichens – this provides camouflage. Inside, it lines the nest with more than 2000 feathers to insulate the nest.

About the construction of nest by the long-tailed tit, it has been written:

"...the most amazing thing about it (the building behaviour) is, in my opinion that so few, so simple and so rigid movements together lead to the construction of so superb a result."

— Niko Tinbergen, 1953.

==== Material of animal origin ====
Birds form the majority of the group of animals which collect building material of animal origin. They collect animal fur and feathers of other species of birds to line their nests. Almost 56% of all families of passerine birds have species which utilise spider silk. Most birds use spider silk as in the case of the long-tailed tit, previously discussed; however the little spiderhunter (Arachnothera longirostra) of Asian tropical forests uses spider silk differently. It constructs a nest of plant strips which it suspends below a large leaf using spider silk for about a 150 or so of "pop-rivets".

==== Plant material ====
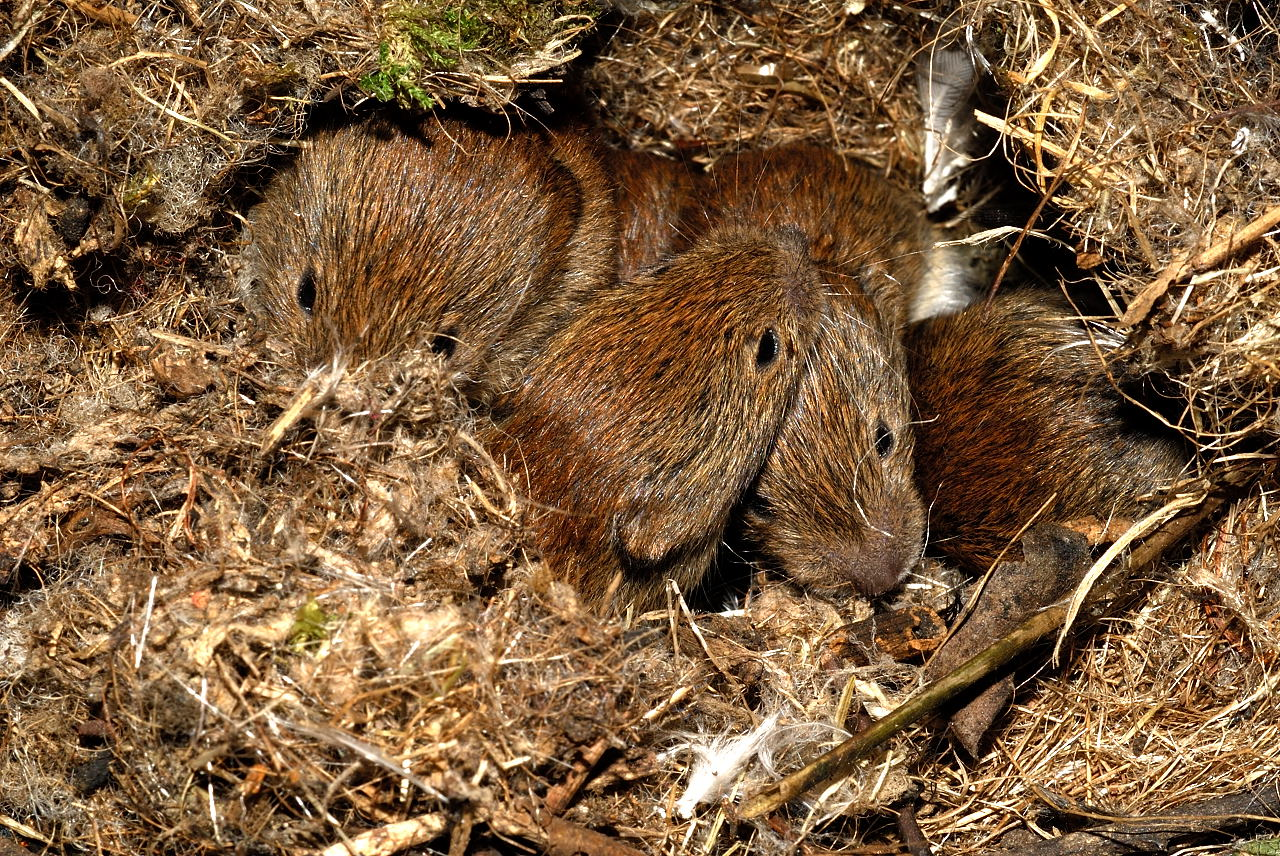
Young bank voles (Myodes glareolus) in their underground chamber which is often lined with moss, feathers and vegetable fiber

Flowering plants provide a variety of resources – twigs, leaves, petioles, roots, flowers and seeds. Basal plants, such as lichens, mosses and ferns also find use in structures built by animals. The leaves of grasses and palms being elongate and parallel-veined are very commonly used for building. These, along with palm fibers and horse-hair fern are used to build hanging baskets. Wooden twigs form the greater proportion of materials used in the nests of large birds. Plants and trees not only provide resources but also sites. Branches provide support in the form of cantilevered beams while leaves and green twigs provide flexible but strong supports.

Structures formed from plant material include beaver dams, which are constructed by foraged branches and sticks. The dam is a wall of sticks constructed on a moving water source, which forces the water to collect in one area and to stop flowing. Beavers begin to build a dam in an area where rocks and other debris slow the flow of the water. The beavers then form a small platform of sticks stretching across the water source. More sticks and branches are added to build the dam up over time. The structure in the center of the dam, known as the lodge, serves as a home for the beavers and protects them from predators. The primary reason behind the construction of beaver dams is to surround the lodge with deep water, which protects the beaver from land-dwelling predators. The entrance of the dam is underwater to prevent predators such as bears and wolves from entering, and the sticks at the top of the lodge are not packed tightly, which allows air into the structure.

==== Mud and stones ====
Mud is used by a few species of a wide variety of families including wasps and birds. Mud is plastic when wet and provides compressive strength when dried. Amongst birds, 5% of all birds use mud and stones in their nest for toughness and compressive strength. Males in some species of crab will construct structures out of mud to attract mates and avoid predators. Uca musica, also known as fiddler crabs, will build short, wide “hoods” out of sand. Another species of crab, Uca beebei, will build tall, thin pillars out of mud. These structures attract female crabs to male crab burrows and provide a hiding place for both males and females when predators are nearby. Beavers will often seal their dams and lodges with mud for extra support.

=== Self-secreted materials ===
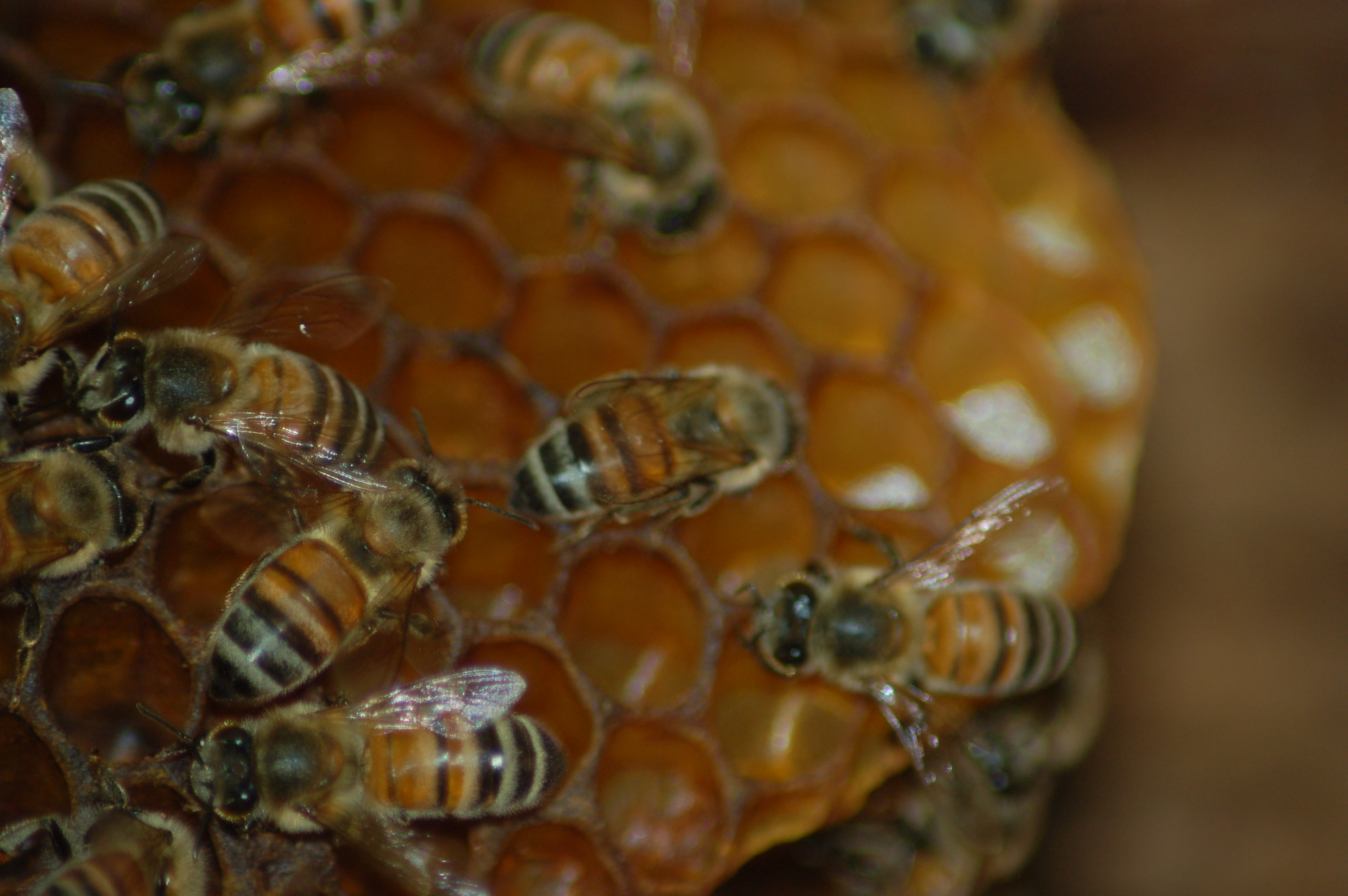
Western honey bees on a wild nest

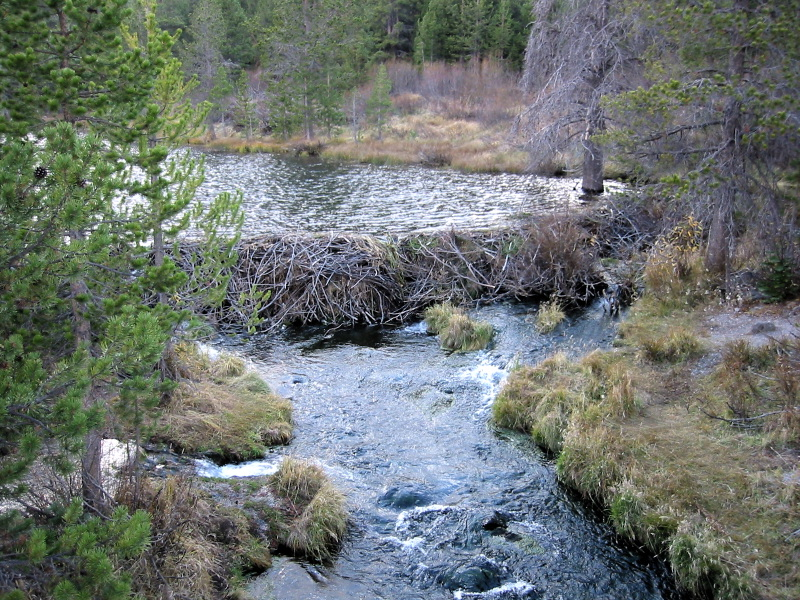
Beaver dams are the largest structures built by non-human animals.

The majority of self-secreted materials are produced by insects and selection acts on this characteristic of production of self-secreting materials and increases the fitness of the animal. In some cases, the self-secreted material is directly applied, as in the case of ecribellate silk, spun by ecribellate spiders, to form sticky traps for prey, or it may be processed, as in the case of salivary excretion used for creation of paper by paper wasps, by blending it directly with wood pulp. Self-secreted materials may be processed in some cases. In cribellate spiders, silk produced by the spider are reworked in the cribellum to form fine sticky strands used for capturing prey. In Chrysomelidae (leaf beetles), larvae in a few subfamilies retain their feces as shield or body armor that may be thermoregulatory, offensive, or defensive In other cases, the scale wax, produced on the bodies of honey bees, is gathered and blended with saliva, to form comb wax, the building material. Not all self-secreted materials are developed specifically for that purpose. For example, bird feathers are used for lining and insulation, a typical example being that of the female common eider duck (Somateria mollissima), which produces down feathers for lining its nest.

Cocoons are another type of structure formed to protect the organism from predation. In order to transform from a larva into a butterfly or moth, a caterpillar must undergo drastic changes in its body. These changes require significant amounts of energy and occur over long periods of time, making a caterpillar very vulnerable to predation. To overcome this, caterpillars will produce silk to form a cocoon or pupa, a structure in which the caterpillar will reside while pupating to lower its risk of predation. Some species of caterpillar, such as the silkworm (Bombyx mori) are able to spin multiple cocoons in the event that one gets destroyed. Other caterpillars will even form defensive structures to accompany their pupas. The Aethria carnicauda caterpillar uses the hairs that cover its body as a defensive mechanism against predators. When it is time to form a cocoon, the caterpillar rips the hairs off of its body and places them around the pupating site. This creates a series of defensive walls to protect the vulnerable caterpillar while resides in its cocoon.

== Evolutionary consequences ==
Recently, some researchers have argued that the structures built by animals affect the evolution of the constructor, a phenomenon known as niche construction.

== See also ==
- Tool use by non-human animals
- Nest-building in primates
