= Fundamentals of Biochemistry =

Biochemistry textbook

Cover of the fifth edition

Fundamentals of Biochemistry: Life at the Molecular Level is a biochemistry textbook written by Donald Voet, Judith G. Voet and Charlotte W. Pratt. Published by John Wiley & Sons, it is a common undergraduate biochemistry textbook.

As of 2024, the book has been published in 6 editions.
