= Charlotte W. Pratt =

American biochemist and author

- Education: University of Notre Dame
- Scientific career
- Fields: Biochemistry
- Workplaces: Seattle Pacific University

Charlotte W. Pratt is an American biochemist and author. She is the co-author with Judith G. Voet and Donald Voet of the popular standard biochemistry textbook Fundamentals of Biochemistry.

As of 2016, she is an associate professor of biochemistry at Seattle Pacific University. She has also written the textbook Essential Biochemistry.

Dr. Pratt attended the University of Notre Dame for her undergraduate degree and graduated with a Ph.D. from Duke University.
