= Lars Bergström (physicist) =

Swedish professor of theoretical physics

- Born: 1952 (age 73–74)
- Education: Royal Institute of Technology
- Known for: Dark matter, Cosmic Rays, Supersymmetry
- Awards: Lindbom Award (1995)
- Scientific career
- Fields: Astroparticle Physics, Cosmology
- Workplaces: Stockholm University
- Doctoral advisor: Håkan Snellman, Sverker Fredriksson
- Doctoral students: Joakim Edsjö, Sunny Vagnozzi

Lars Bergström (born 1952) is a Swedish professor of theoretical physics specializing in astroparticle physics at Stockholm University, AlbaNova campus. He is a member of the Royal Swedish Academy of Sciences and since 2004 serves as the secretary of the Nobel Committee for Physics.

== Education and Academic Career ==
Bergström received his PhD 1981 from the Royal Institute of Technology, with a thesis by the title of "Aspects of bound states in hadron physics". After a postdoctoral fellowship at CERN, he was nominated docent in theoretical physics at the Royal Institute of Technology. Afterwards, he was appointed professor of theoretical physics at Uppsala University, before becoming associate professor at Stockholm University in 1995. From 2008 to 2014 he has served as director of the Oskar Klein Centre for Cosmoparticle Physics.

== Contributions ==
Bergström has worked at the interface of particle physics, astrophysics and cosmology. He has collaborated in numerous international experiments, including AMANDA, IceCube and Fermi. His contributions have been exceptionally important in the field of dark matter indirect detection, through the search of annihilation products of dark matter in the Universe. Together with Paolo Gondolo, Joakim Edsjö, Piero Ullio, Mia Schelke and Edward Baltz, he developed DarkSUSY, a famous numerical package for neutralino dark matter calculations. Bergström has also contributed importantly to the field of supersymmetry, particularly studying supersymmetric dark matter candidates. Bergström has published over 100 papers in peer-reviewed journals.

=== Papers ===
- Papers listed on the Smithsonian/NASA Astrophysics Data System (ADS)

=== Books ===
- "Cosmology and Particle Physics"; Bergström with Ariel Goobar, 2nd ed. Springer (2004). ISBN 3-540-43128-4
