= Joakim Edsjö =

Swedish professor of theoretical physics

- Education: Uppsala University
- Known for: Dark matter, Cosmic Rays, Supersymmetry
- Scientific career
- Fields: Astroparticle Physics, Cosmology
- Workplaces: Stockholm University
- Doctoral advisor: Lars Bergström, Hector Rubinstein

Joakim Edsjö is a Swedish professor of theoretical physics at Stockholm University. His research is carried out at the interface of particle physics, astrophysics and cosmology, and is particularly concerned with the search for dark matter.

== Education and academic career ==
Edsjö received his PhD in 1997 from the Uppsala University, with a thesis by the title of "Aspects of neutrino detection of neutralino dark matter". He then went on for a postdoctoral fellowship at the University of California, Berkeley, before returning to Sweden to take up a position as professor at Stockholm University. Edsjö is well known for having developed DarkSUSY, a famous numerical package for neutralino dark matter calculations, together with Paolo Gondolo, Lars Bergström, Piero Ullio, Mia Schelke and Edward Baltz. Together with Pat Scott and Malcolm Fairbairn, he developed DarkStars, a code that implements capture, annihilation and energy transport by dark matter in a stellar evolution code.

His most cited paper,"DarkSUSY: Computing Supersymmetric Dark Matter Properties Numerically" has been cited 1035 times according to Google Scholar
