= Pietro G. Frè =

Italian theoretical physicist

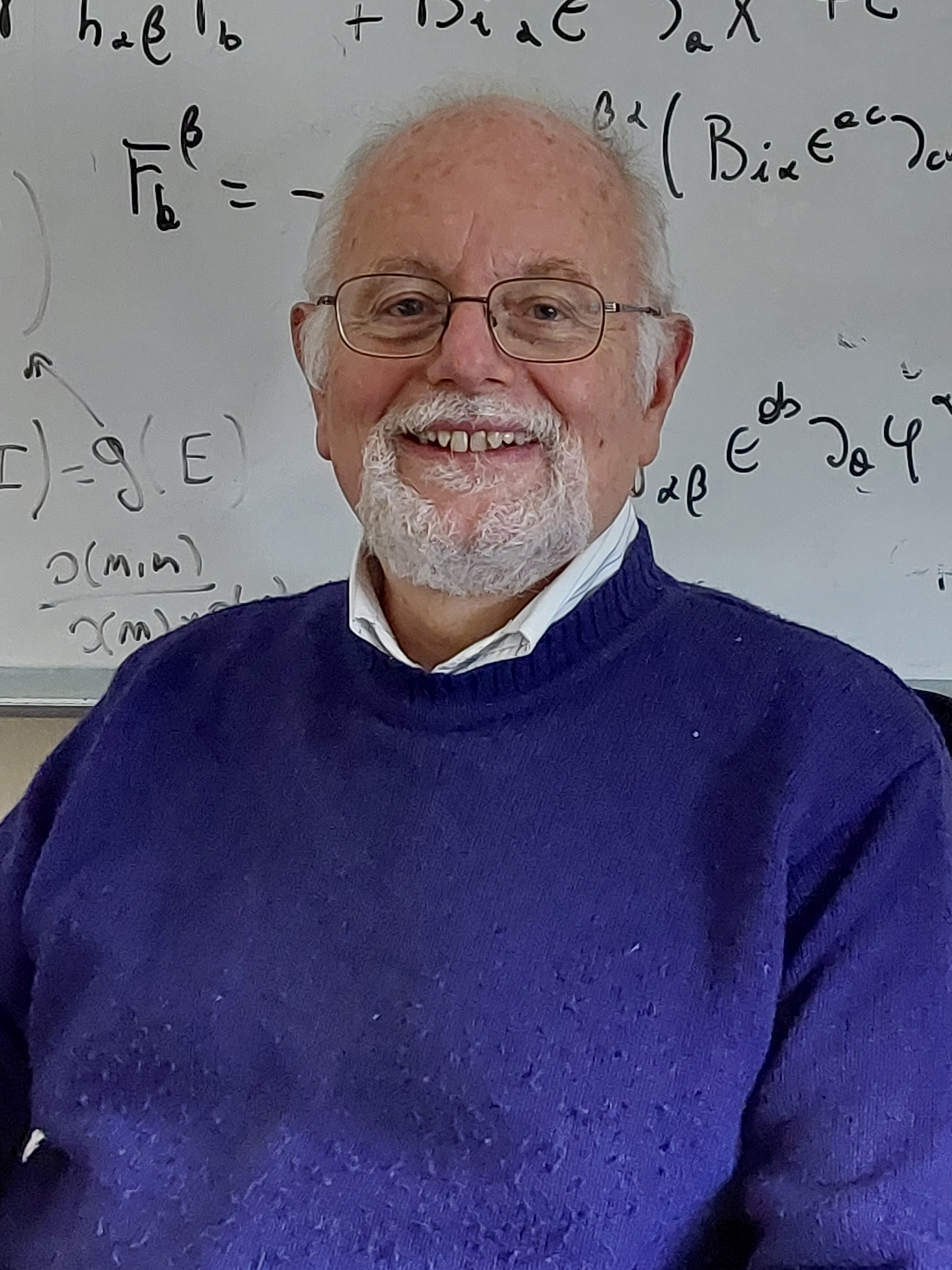
Pietro G. Frè (2023)

Pietro G. Frè (born 1952) is an Italian theoretical physicist and an emeritus full professor of the University of Turin.

== Early life and education ==
Pietro G. Frè was born in Alessandria, Italy in 1952.

== Career ==
Frè was a fellow at the Theoretical Division of CERN, a post-doctoral fellow at the California Institute of Technology and Bielefeld University in the early years of his career. He was an associate professor at the University of Turin, a full professor at the International School for Advanced Studies for six years, and, since 1996, a full professor at the University of Turin as the chair of general relativity.

From 2009 to 2017 he was the scientific counselor of the Italian Embassy in Moscow. From 1996 to 2000 he was president of SIGRAV (Italian Society of General Relativity and Physics of Gravitation), and from 2017 to 2021 he was director of the Arnold Regge Center of Theoretical Physics.

== Contributions ==
Among his major contributions in theoretical physics, of particular note are the introduction of the rheonomic formulation of supergravity (with R. D'Auria), the independent invention under the name of "Cartan Integrable Systems" of Free Differential Algebras and their extension with fermionic p-forms, the D'Auria-Frè algebra, later evolved into the L-infinity algebras, the geometric formulation of the eleven-dimensional supergravity (low-energy limit of M-theory), the geometric systematization of the N=2 Supergravity lagrangian (with S. Ferrara et al.), the introduction of the embedding matrix formulation of maximal gauged sueprgravity, later evolved in the embedding tensor formulation of extended supergravities, the discovery of some of the homogeneous Sasakian manifolds in seven dimensions and the first development of their holographic equivalents by quivers.

In recent years Pietro Frè has made original research in the context of Kronheimer construction and McKay quivers.

== Essays and Literature ==
Pietro Frè is also an essay and novel writer. He has published a few novels in Italian and essays on the history of mathematical conceptions and an essay on the history of Ukraine and Russia.

== See also ==
- Riccardo D'Auria (theoretical physicist)
