= Rosalba Perna =

Italian-American theoretical astrophysicist

Rosalba Perna is an Italian and American theoretical astrophysicist whose research concerns high-energy cosmic sources including gamma-ray bursts and neutron star mergers. She has also studied exoplanets and the growth of supermassive black holes. She is professor of physics and astronomy at Stony Brook University.

== Education and career ==
Perna earned a laurea at the University of Salerno in 1993, with a thesis concerning the quantum Hall effect. In the same year, she also earned a diploma in music, as a piano player, at the Conservatory of Music Carlo Gesualdo Da Venosa in Potenza. She completed a Ph.D. in physics at Harvard University in 1999, with the dissertation Theoretical studies of Gamma-Ray Bursts supervised by Avi Loeb.

She continued at Harvard as a Harvard Junior Fellow from 1999 to 2003. She did continued postdoctoral research at Princeton University as a Lyman Spitzer Fellow and then, in 2004, became an assistant professor of astrophysics at the University of Colorado Boulder. After earning tenure there in 2011, she moved to Stony Brook University in 2014, and became a full professor at Stony Brook in 2017.

== Recognition ==
Perna won the SIGRAV Prize of the Italian Society for General Relativity and Gravitation in 2010. In 2014 she was named a Fellow of the American Physical Society (APS), after a nomination from the APS Division of Astrophysics, "for her pioneering contributions to our understanding of the long and short gamma-ray bursts, including the development of advanced models to describe their properties and environments, calculations of their particle and radiative emission, and innovative treatment of the time-dependent photoinization in the dusty environment around the bursts".
