= Italian Society for General Relativity and Gravitation =

- Abbreviation: SIGRAV
- Formation: 22 November 1990
- Type: Scientific
- Location: Gran Sasso Science Institute, L'Aquila (Italy)
- Members: 66
- Website: http://www.sigrav.org/

The Italian Society on General Relativity and Gravitation (SIGRAV), founded in 1990, is a non-profit association whose purpose is to bring together the members of Italian scientific community who are interested in various aspects of general relativity and in gravitation physics.

SIGRAV brings together experts and researchers involved in classical and quantum gravity, astrophysics, relativistic cosmology and experimental gravity, and it has been organizing biennial national congresses. Its other activities include managing the SIGRAV School and the Virgo School. At the time of the national congress it awards the SIGRAV prizes and the Amaldi medal.

The official address of SIGRAV is located at viale F. Crispi, in L'Aquila, at the premises of the Gran Sasso Science Institute (GSSI).

== List of the presidents ==
The following list includes both the honorary as well as the elected ones, ordered according to appointment year.

=== Honorary presidents ===
- Tullio Regge

=== Four year term presidents ===
- Mauro Francaviglia, 1992-1996
- Pietro Fré, 1996-2000
- Eugenio Coccia, 2000-2004
- Luca Lusanna, 2004-2008
- Mauro Francaviglia, 2008-2012
- Salvatore Capozziello, 2012-2018
- Fulvio Ricci, 2018-2022
- Stefano Liberati, 2022-2026
- Mariafelicia De Laurentis, 2026-2030

== Amaldi medals ==
Every 2 years, SIGRAV awards the prestigious European Prize for Gravitational Physics “Edoardo Amaldi” The Prize, consisting in a gold medal valued about 10K€ (whenever the Prize is not shared), is reserved to scientists who carry out their activity in Europe and have given seminal contributions to the Physics of Gravitation. The Prize will be awarded every two years, following the indications of the SIGRAV Board, during the SIGRAV National Conferences.

- 2004 Roger Penrose
- 2006 Bernard Schutz
- 2008 Sergio Ferrara
- 2010 Thibault Damour
- 2012 Viatcheslav Mukhanov and Alexei Starobinsky
- 2014 Nazzareno Mandolesi and Sergei Odintsov
- 2016 Guido Pizzella and Adalberto Giazotto
- 2018 Stefano Vitale and Yvonne Choquet-Bruhat
- 2021 Heino Falcke and Andrzej Mariusz Trautman
- 2023 Joseph Silk and Gabriele Veneziano

== SIGRAV Prizes ==
Two prestigious “SIGRAV Prizes” for “Classical and Quantum Gravity” and “Astrophysics, Cosmology and Experimental Gravity” are awarded upon nomination by SIGRAV every two years, to young Italian scientists below the age of 40 at the time of the nomination, who have particularly distinguished themselves in the fields of general relativity and gravitational physics, and who are among the most promising researchers in the fields of gravitation and cosmology.

=== List of the recipients for the “Classical and Quantum Gravity” prize ===
- 1994 Massimo Bianchi, Augusto Sagnotti
- 1998 Massimo Porrati
- 2000 Alberto Zaffaroni
- 2002 Massimo Giovannini
- 2004 Carlo Angelantonj
- 2006 Claudio Dappiaggi
- 2008 Gianguido Dall’Agata
- 2010 Dario Martelli, Alessandro Tomasiello
- 2012 Fabrizio Canfora, Dario Francia
- 2014 Simone Giombi
- 2016 Paolo Pani
- 2018 Riccardo Ciolfi
- 2021 Andrea Giusti
- 2023 Giulia Gubitosi

=== List of the recipients for the “Astrophysics, Cosmology and Experimental Gravity” prize ===
- 1994 Pietro Tricarico
- 1998 Gabriele Ghisellini
- 2000 Alessandra Buonanno, Luigi Stella, Mario Vietri
- 2002 Livia Conti, Viviana Fafone, Alberto Vecchio
- 2004 Giovanni Miniutti
- 2006 Marta Burgay
- 2008 Michele Vallisneri
- 2010 Rosalba Perna
- 2012 Mariafelicia De Laurentis
- 2014 Michele Liguori, Giovanni Marozzi, Giulia Pagliaroli
- 2016 Marco Drago, Enrico Barausse
- 2018 Marica Branchesi
- 2021 Micol Benetti, Davide Gerosa
- 2023 Sunny Vagnozzi
