= Mauro Francaviglia =

Italian mathematician (1953–2013)

- Born: 22 June 1953; Turin, Italy
- Died: 24 June 2013 (aged 60); Rende, Italy
- Education: University of Turin
- Scientific career
- Fields: Mathematics
- Doctoral advisor: Dionigi Galletto

Mauro Francaviglia (22 June 1953 – 24 June 2013) was an Italian mathematician.

He was a professor at University of Turin and he worked mainly on geometric methods applied to mechanics, mathematical physics and general relativity.

== Biography ==
Francaviglia obtained a degree in Mathematics at University of Turin in 1975 under the supervision of Dionigi Galletto. In the same university, he was a fellow of the CNR (the Italian National Research Council) from 1975 to 1978 and a teaching assistant from 1978 to 1980. In 1976 he was awarded the Bonavera Prize from the Accademia delle Scienze di Torino nel 1977.

He became full Professor at University of Turin in 1980, when he was 27 years old (the youngest full professor in his discipline). He spent the last years of his life at the University of Calabria, in Arcavacata di Rende.

Besides his scientific activities, Francaviglia was a prominent philatelist. He has been president of the Unione Filatelica Subalpina di Torino, vice-president of the Federazione tra le società filateliche italiane, council member of the Unione stampa filatelica italiana, member of the Royal Philatelic Society London and council member of the Académie européenne de philatélie.

== Research ==
Francaviglia's scientific interests covered a wide range of topics, including the application of differential geometry in mathematical physics, classical mechanics, general relativity and field theories, calculus of variations, symmetries and conservation laws, quantization and thermodynamics.

He was author of over 250 papers, three monographs and 11 encyclopaedia long entries, and he supervised 6 PhD students.

He was director of several courses at Centro internazionale matematico estivo; he organized 20 national and international conferences, among which the 14th World Conference on General Relativity in Florence (1995).

He was member of the Scientific Council of the INdAM National Group for Mathematical Physics (GNFM) (1980–1996) and life member of the International Society on General Relativity. In 1990 he founded the Italian Society for General Relativity and Gravitation (SIGRAV), of which he was president for two terms (1992–1996 and 2008–2012). He also served as a member of the Board of the International Society on General Relativity and Gravitation (IGRG) for nine years (1986–1995).

Francaviglia was co-founder (1984) and Managing Editor of Journal of Geometry and Physics, Associate Editor of the Journal of General Relativity and Gravitation since 1999 and Managing Editor of the International Journal of Geometric Methods in Modern Physics. A special issue of the last journal has published a collection of scientific contributions from several Francaviglia's collaborators, presented in a workshop in his memory two years after his death.

== Monographs ==
- Elements of Differential and Riemannian Geometry, Monographs and Textbooks in Physical Sciences, Lecture Notes 4 (Proceedings Summer School on "Geometrical Methods in Theoretical Physics", Ferrara 1987), Bibliopolis, Napoli, (1988), ISBN 8870881784
- Relativistic Theories (The Variational Formulation), XIII Scuola Estiva di Fisica Matematica, Ravello 1988, Quaderni del CNR, Gruppo Nazionale di Fisica Matematica, (1991).
- (with L. Fatibene), Natural and Gauge-Natural Formalism for Classical Field Theories: A Geometric Perspective including Spinors and Gauge Theories, Kluwer Academic Publishers, Dordrecht, The Netherlands, (2003). ISBN 978-90-481-6461-5, doi:10.1007/978-94-017-2384-8
