= Riccardo D'Auria =

Italian theoretical physicist

- Born: 1940 (age 85–86); Rome, Italy
- Education: University of Turin
- Known for: Superstring theory, asymptotically flat gravitational instanton
- Scientific career
- Fields: Theoretical physics
- Workplaces: University of Turin; Polytechnic University of Turin

Riccardo D'Auria (born 1940) is an Italian theoretical physicist and an emeritus full professor of the Polytechnic University of Turin.

== Early life and education ==
Riccardo D'Auria was born in Rome, Italy in 1940. He graduated in Physics at the University of Turin, under the supervision of Prof. Tullio Regge.

== Career ==
He was an associate professor at the University of Turin, a full professor at University of Padua and, eventually, at the Polytechnic University of Turin. There he founded a theoretical physics group, oriented towards particle physics, field theory, gravity and supergravity. From 1996 to 2000 he was director of the Department of Physics of the Polytechnic University of Turin.

He spent several extended periods at CERN and at the University of California, Los Angeles.

== Contributions ==
Riccardo D'Auria contributed, in the early years of superstring theory and in collaboration with a group of string theorists, to the introduction of internal flavour symmetry and color symmetry in a string algebra.

In collaboration with Pietro G. Frè (and following a proposal by Y. Ne'eman and T. Regge), he developed a new approach to supergravity called geometric or rheonomic approach. Of special interest is the application of this approach to the study of theories where the physical fields include p-forms of degree higher than one, in particular, the eleven-dimensional supergravity, the low-energy description of M-theory. By a generalisation of the Cartan-Maurer equations of an ordinary (graded) Lie algebra, a new graded algebra was introduced, called Cartan integrable system, by means of which a geometric approach to higher-dimensional theories can be realised This mathematical structure is the first example of an L-infinity algebra developed in mathematics some ten years after their original results, and formulated in the space dual to the space of differential p-forms.

In collaboration with Tullio Regge, R. D'Auria explicitly constructed an asymptotically flat gravitational instanton solution of the four-dimensional Einstein theory.

He also completed, with Leonardo Castellani and Sergio Ferrara, the full formulation of Special Kaehler Geometry, which allows the precise formulation of N=2 supergravity in four dimensions. This eventually led him, within a different collaboration, to obtain the result of constructing the most general matter-coupled N=2 supergravity in four dimensions.

== Books ==
- Castellani, Leonardo; D'Auria, Riccardo; Fré, Pietro (1991). Supergravity and Superstrings: A Geometric Perspective: (In 3 Volumes). WORLD SCIENTIFIC. doi:10.1142/0224. ISBN 978-9971-5-0037-5.
- D'Auria, Riccardo; Trigiante, Mario (2016). From Special Relativity to Feynman Diagrams: A Course in Theoretical Particle Physics for Beginners. UNITEXT for Physics. Cham: Springer International Publishing. Bibcode:2016fsrf.book.....D. doi:10.1007/978-3-319-22014-7. ISBN 978-3-319-22013-0.
