= Katherine Freese =

American astrophysicist

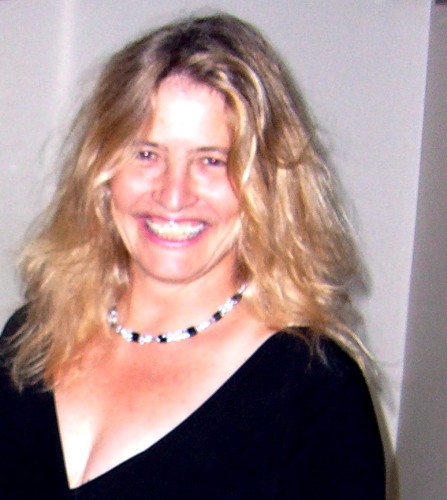
- Katherine Freese in 2005
- Born: February 8, 1957 (age 69); Freiburg, Baden-Württemberg, Germany
- Education: Princeton University, Columbia University, University of Chicago
- Known for: Dark matter, Dark stars, Dark energy, Inflation
- Awards: Simons Foundation Fellowship (2012); Lilienfeld Prize (2019); Member of the National Academy Sciences (2020)
- Scientific career
- Fields: Astrophysics, Cosmology
- Workplaces: University of Texas at Austin; University of Michigan; Nordita, Stockholm University
- Doctoral advisor: David Schramm
- Doctoral students: Janna Levin; Sunny Vagnozzi

Katherine Freese (born 8 February 1957) is a theoretical astrophysicist. She is currently a professor and Director of the Weinberg Institute for Theoretical Physics at the University of Texas at Austin, where she holds the Jeff and Gail Kodosky Endowed Chair in Physics. She is known for her work in theoretical cosmology at the interface of particle physics and astrophysics.

== Education and academic career ==
Freese received her BA from Princeton University, one of the first women to major in physics at Princeton. She obtained her MA from Columbia University, and her PhD at the University of Chicago from advisor David Schramm. After postdoctoral fellowships at Harvard University, at the Kavli Institute for Theoretical Physics at University of California, Santa Barbara, and as a Presidential Fellow at the University of California, Berkeley, she became an assistant professor at MIT. She moved to the University of Michigan in Ann Arbor, where she was the George E. Uhlenbeck Professor of Physics. Freese has worked as the associate director of the Michigan Center for Theoretical Physics. In September 2014, she assumed the position of director of Nordita, the Nordic Institute for Theoretical Physics, in Stockholm, and holds a position as visiting professor of physics at Stockholm University. In 2019, Freese moved to the University of Texas at Austin, where she holds the Jeff and Gail Kodosky Endowed Chair in Physics.

== Contributions ==
Freese has contributed to early research on dark matter and dark energy. She was one of the first to propose ways to discover dark matter. Her idea of indirect detection in the Earth is being pursued by the IceCube Neutrino Observatory experiment, and the "wind" of dark matter particles felt as the Earth orbits the Milky Way (work with David Spergel) is being searched for in worldwide experiments. Her work decisively ruled out MACHO (Massive compact halo object) dark matter in favor of WIMPs (weakly interacting massive particles). She has proposed a model known as "Cardassian expansion," in which dark energy is replaced with a modification of Einstein's equations. Recently she proposed a new theoretical type of star, called a dark star, powered by dark matter annihilation rather than fusion.

Freese has also worked on the beginnings of the universe, including the search for a successful inflationary theory to kick off the Big Bang. Her natural inflation model is a theoretically well-motivated variant of inflation; it uses axionic-type particles to provide the required flat potentials to drive the expansion. In 2013, observations made by the European Space Agency's Planck Satellite show that the framework of natural inflation matches the data. This is now strongly disfavoured by the more recent Planck 2018 and BICEP2/Keck data. She has studied the Ultimate fate of the universe, including the fate of life in the universe.

Freese has served on the board of the Kavli Institute for Theoretical Physics in Santa Barbara and the board of the Aspen Center for Physics. From 2008 to 2012 she was a councilor and member of the executive committee of the American Physical Society, She has also served as a member of the board for the Oskar Klein Centre for Cosmoparticle Physics in Stockholm.

== Honors ==
Freese was elected Fellow of the American Physical Society in 2009. She received a Simons Foundation Fellowship in Theoretical Physics in 2012. In September 2012, Freese was awarded an honorary doctorate (honoris causa) from the Stockholm University. She was awarded the 2019 Julius Edgar Lilienfeld Prize from the American Physical Society "For ground-breaking research at the interface of cosmology and particle physics, and her tireless efforts to communicate the excitement of physics to the general public." In 2021 she was awarded the University of Chicago Alumni Professional Achievement Award. In 2020 she was elected to the National Academy of Sciences.

== Personal life ==
Freese was born in Freiburg, Germany in 1957. She is the daughter of Dr. Elisabeth Bautz and Ernst Freese, a molecular biologist. Her brother, Andrew Freese, deceased, was Chief of Neurosurgery at Brandywine Hospital, and performed the first surgery for gene therapy on humans.

== Popular science ==
Freese has written a review for the general educated public on dark matter and energy as they relate to recent research in cosmology and particle physics, titled The Cosmic Cocktail: Three Parts Dark Matter (Science Essentials, 2014, ISBN 0691153353). The book is partly autobiographical. She covers the contributions of Fritz Zwicky, for example, who was recently profiled as "the most important astronomer you've never heard of" and "the father of dark matter" on Cosmos: A Spacetime Odyssey.

Freese has appeared in seasons 3 and 5 of Through the Wormhole with Morgan Freeman.
