= Alfredo di Braccio Award =

The Alfredo di Braccio Award is a prize for young Italian scientists given by the Italian Accademia Nazionale dei Lincei.

== Award winners ==
Every year a top young chemist or physicist receives this honor for their research.

- 2008 Chemistry prize was awarded to Lorenzo Malavasi (University of Pavia, Italy)
- 2009 Physics prize was awarded (ex aequo) to Alessandro Mirizzi (University of Bari, Italy) and Alessio Recati (CNR Trento, Italy)
- 2010 Chemistry prize was awarded to Riccardo Baron (Codoxo, USA)
- 2011 Physics prize was awarded (ex aequo) to Antonio Politano (University of Calabria, Italy) and Alessandro Giuliani (Roma Tre University, Italy)
- 2012 Chemistry prize was awarded to Tiziano Montini (University of Trieste, Italy)
- 2013 Physics prize was awarded (ex aequo) to Francesco Pellegrino (University of Catania, Italy) and Pasquale Serpico (CNRS, France)
- 2014 Physics prize was awarded to Stefano Protti (University of Pavia)
- 2015 Physics prize was awarded (ex aequo) to Filippo Caruso (University of Florence, Italy), Michele Cicoli (University of Bologna, Italy), and Alessandro Pitanti (CNR Pisa, Italy)
- 2016 Chemistry prize was awarded to Francesca Maria Toma (Lawrence Berkeley National Laboratory, Italy)
- 2017 Physics prize was awarded to Marco Genoni (University of Milan, Italy)
- 2018 Chemistry prize was awarded to Lorenzo Mino (University of Turin, Italy)
- 2019 Physics prize awarded (ex aequo) to Matteo Lucchini and Andrea Crespi (Polytechnic University of Milan, Italy), and Lorenzo Rovigatti (University of Rome "La Sapienza", Italy)
- 2020 Chemistry prize was awarded to Raffaele Cucciniello (University of Salerno, Italy)
- 2021 Physics prize was awarded (ex aequo) to Eleonora Di Valentino (Durham University, UK) and Sunny Vagnozzi (University of Cambridge, UK)
- 2022 Chemistry prize was awarded to Gianvito Vilé (Polytechnic University of Milan, Italy)

== See also ==
- List of chemistry awards
- List of physics awards
