= Sunny Vagnozzi =

Italian cosmologist and academic

- Born: 1992 (age 33–34); Latina
- Relatives: Simone Vagnozzi
- Awards: Buchalter Prize (2021); SIGRAV Prize (2023),Clarivate Highly Cited Researcher (2025, 2026)

Academic background
- Education: B.Sc. University of Trento; M.Sc. University of Melbourne; Ph.D. Stockholm University
- Doctoral advisor: Katherine Freese, Lars Bergström

Academic work
- Institutions: University of Trento

Sunny Vagnozzi is an Italian cosmologist. He is an associate professor at the University of Trento.

Vagnozzi is known for his contributions at the interface of cosmology, particle physics, and astrophysics, with a primary focus on determining the fundamental nature of dark matter and dark energy. He has been awarded the Buchalter Cosmology Prize for his work on dark energy, is the recipient of the 2023 SIGRAV Prize, and has been included in the Clarivate Highly Cited Researchers list in 2025 and 2026.

== Education ==
Vagnozzi earned a Bachelor of Science in Physics from the University of Trento in 2012, followed by a Master of Science in Physics from the University of Melbourne in 2014. Later in 2019, he completed a Ph.D. in Theoretical Physics from Stockholm University.

== Career ==
Following his PhD, Vagnozzi joined the Kavli Institute for Cosmology at the University of Cambridge as a Newton-Kavli Fellow. In 2022, he returned to the University of Trento, where he has served as assistant professor until 2025, when he received tenure and was promoted to associate professor.

== Awards and honors ==
- 2021 – Alfredo di Braccio Prize, Accademia dei Lincei
- 2022 – Buchalter Cosmology Prize (third prize)
- 2022 – Marie Skłodowska-Curie Fellowship
- 2023 – SIGRAV Prize
- 2025 – Clarivate Highly Cited Researcher

== Personal life ==
Vagnozzi is first cousin of tennis coach and former tennis player Simone Vagnozzi. He holds a violin diploma from Santa Cecilia Conservatory.
