= Donald Voet =

American biochemist (1938–2023)

- Born: November 29, 1938
- Died: April 11, 2023 (aged 84)
- Education: California Institute of Technology; Harvard University
- Known for: X-ray crystallography, author (with J. G. Voet) of Biochemistry and other textbooks.
- Spouse: Judith G. Voet
- Scientific career
- Fields: Biochemistry
- Workplaces: University of Pennsylvania
- Thesis: Some borane derivative structures (1967)
- Doctoral advisor: William Lipscomb
- Other academic advisors: Alexander Rich

Donald Herman Voet (/ˈvoʊt/ VOHT; November 29, 1938 – April 11, 2023) was an American biochemist who was emeritus associate professor of chemistry at the University of Pennsylvania. His laboratory used x-ray crystallography to understand structure-function relationships in proteins. He and his wife, Judith G. Voet, are authors of biochemistry text books that are widely used in undergraduate and graduate curricula.

== Early life and education ==
Voet was born on November 29, 1938. He earned his B.S. in chemistry from the California Institute of Technology in 1960 and his Ph.D. in chemistry from Harvard University with William N. Lipscomb, Jr. in 1967.

== Career ==
Voet completed his postdoctoral research at the Massachusetts Institute of Technology in 1969 in the laboratory of Alexander Rich. He later became a professor in the chemistry department at the University of Pennsylvania. Voet and his wife were coeditors-in-chief of the journal Biochemical and Molecular Biology Education.

== Death ==
Voet died on April 11, 2023, at the age of 84.

== Notable publications ==
- Voet, D; Voet, J.G.; and Pratt, C.W., Fundamentals of Biochemistry, Life at the molecular level (4th ed.), John Wiley & Sons (2013)
- Voet, D. and Voet, J, G., Biochemistry (4th ed.), John Wiley & Sons Inc.: Hoboken, NJ (2011)
- Voet, D; Voet, J.G.; and Pratt, C.W., Fundamentals of Biochemistry (3rd ed.), John Wiley & Sons (2008)
- Uzman, A.; Eichberg, J.; Widger, W.; Cornely, K.; Voet, D.; Voet, J.G.; and Pratt, C.W.; Student Companion to Accompany Fundamentals of Biochemistry (2nd ed.), John Wiley & Sons (2006)
- Voet, D; Voet, J.G.; and Pratt, C.W.; Fundamentals of Biochemistry (2nd ed.), John Wiley & Sons (2006)
- Voet, D. and Voet, J. G., Solutions Manual to Accompany Biochemistry (3rd ed.), John Wiley & Sons (2004)
- Voet, D. and Voet, J. G., Biochemistry (3rd ed.), John Wiley & Sons (2004)
