= Judith G. Voet =

American biochemist (born 1941)

- Born: March 10, 1941 (age 85); New York City, New York, U.S.
- Education: Antioch College
- Known for: Author (with D. Voet) of Biochemistry and other textbooks
- Scientific career
- Fields: Biochemistry
- Workplaces: Swarthmore College

Judith Greenwald Voet (born March 10, 1941) is a James Hammons Professor, Emerita in the department of chemistry and biochemistry at Swarthmore College. Her research interests include enzyme reaction mechanisms and enzyme inhibition. She and her husband, Donald Voet, are authors of biochemistry textbooks that are widely used in undergraduate and graduate curricula.

== Education ==
Voet earned her B.S. degree from Antioch College and her Ph.D. from Brandeis University.

== Career ==
Voet participated in postdoctoral research at the University of Pennsylvania, Haverford College, and the Fox Chase Cancer Center before securing her faculty position at Swarthmore in 1979. Voet and her husband were coeditors-in-chief of the journal Biochemical and Molecular Biology Education.

== Notable publications ==
- Voet, D; Voet, J.G.; and Pratt, C.W., Fundamentals of Biochemistry, Life at the molecular level (4th ed.), John Wiley & Sons (2013)
- Voet, D; Voet, J.G.; and Pratt, C.W., Fundamentals of Biochemistry (3rd ed.), John Wiley & Sons (2008)
- Uzman, A.; Eichberg, J.; Widger, W.; Cornely, K.; Voet, D.; Voet, J.G.; and Pratt, C.W.; Student Companion to Accompany Fundamentals of Biochemistry (2nd ed.), John Wiley & Sons (2006)
- Voet, D; Voet, J.G.; and Pratt, C.W.; Fundamentals of Biochemistry (2nd ed.), John Wiley & Sons (2006)
- Voet, D. and Voet, J. G., Solutions Manual to Accompany Biochemistry (3rd ed.), John Wiley & Sons (2004)
- Voet, D. and Voet, J. G., Biochemistry (3rd ed.), John Wiley & Sons (2004)
- Voet, D. and Voet, J. G., Biochemistry (4th ed.), John Wiley & Sons (2010)
