= Harlan Lewis =

American botanist

- Born: Frank Harlan Lewis; January 8, 1919; Redlands, California
- Died: December 12, 2008 (aged 89); Pacific Palisades, Los Angeles
- Spouse(s): Margaret Ruth Ensign, August 2, 1945 and August 2, 1984; Ann Gibbons, December 23, 1968
- Children: Donald Austin Lewis; Frank Murray Lewis
- Awards: Dean of Life Sciences, University of California, Los Angeles 1962-1981; Fellow of the American Association for the Advancement of Science (1955); Guggenheim Fellowship (1955); President of the Pacific Division of the Botanical Society of America (1959); President of Society for the Study of Evolution (1961); President of the American Society of Plant Taxonomists (1969); President of the International Organization of Plant Biosystematics (1969-1975); President of the American Society of Naturalists (1971); Fellow of the California Academy of Sciences; 2006 Dickson Emeritus Professor of the Year

Frank Harlan Lewis (January 8, 1919 – December 12, 2008) was an American botanist, geneticist, taxonomist, systematist, and evolutionist who worked primarily with plants in the genus Clarkia. He is best known for his theories of "catastrophic selection" and "saltational speciation", which are closely aligned with the concepts of quantum evolution and sympatric speciation. The concepts were first articulated in 1958 by Lewis and Peter H. Raven, and later refined in a 1962 paper by Lewis in which he coined the term "catastrophic selection". In 1966, he referred to the same mechanism as "saltational speciation".

Lewis was Dean of Life Sciences at the University of California, Los Angeles from 1962 to 1981, a Fellow of the American Association for the Advancement of Science (1955), recipient of a Guggenheim Fellowship (1955), president of the Pacific Division of the Botanical Society of America (1959), president of the Society for the Study of Evolution (1961), president of the American Society of Plant Taxonomists (1969), president of the International Organization of Plant Biosystematics (1969–1975), and president of the American Society of Naturalists (1971), as well as a Fellow of the California Academy of Sciences. In 2006, he became the Dickson Emeritus Professor of the Year at UCLA.

== Early life ==
Lewis grew up on a ranch in Redlands, California, where his father grew apricots and oranges. His interest in plants dates at least from the age of 10 when his fifth grade teacher taught the class how to press flowers. His junior high and Redlands High School teachers continued to encourage his interest in plants. When he was in 10th grade he got permission to take a class in botany usually restricted to 11th and 12th graders. The teacher, Eva Maye Hyde, had been a student of Philip A. Munz; she also inducted him into the Samuel B. Parish Botanical Society, a group for amateur botanists in Southern California. He became president of the society in about 1939. During this time he attended a Botanical Society of America meeting, where he met Willis Linn Jepson.

== Education ==
Harlan Lewis graduated from Redlands High School in 1937, and got an A.A. degree in 1939 from San Bernardino Valley College.

He transferred to UCLA in 1939 as a junior. He started work with Carl Epling as an undergraduate, and published a paper with him in 1940 as the first author on the distributions of three species pairs in Californian chaparral and coastal sage plant communities. He continued with Epling as a graduate student, and got his M.A. in 1942 working on the genus Trichostema in the family Lamiaceae. His Ph.D. work concerned diploid and tetraploid Californian species of Delphinium. WWII interrupted his studies, and he completed his thesis in 1946.

Lewis became a faculty member at UCLA in that same year, 1946.

== Military ==
He joined the United States Army Air Corps at the start of WWII, working at Caltech with Frits Warmolt Went on camouflage.

== Research ==
Harlan Lewis in experimental garden at UCLA

Harlan Lewis' research interests were far ranging. They included taxonomy, cytogenetics, systematics, genetics, evolution, plant distributions, and even physiological ecology. And all of these manifested themselves before 1950. Indeed, as a young scientist he was involved with many research topics. His first publication was with Carl Epling in 1940 covered the distributions of three species pairs in Californian chaparral and coastal sage scrub communities. In this paper he shows his first interest in plant distributions as they relate to speciation. His next publications with Epling followed in 1942. One was taxonomic in nature, a continuing interest of his, and concerned itself with the genus Monarda in the Lamiaceae. His second paper in 1942 concerned itself with the distributions of the chaparral and coastal sage scrub communities in cis-montane California, and they concluded that these two communities had their centers of distribution in San Diego County, and probably entered the Southwestern United States from the North American Plateau. He also received his M.A. degree in 1942 on a completely different subject: the taxonomy of Trichostema in the Lamiaceae, which was published in 1945. As a result of his work with Frits Went at California Institute of Technology during the WWII years he published on yet a different subject: that of the response of 13 California annuals to photoperiod and temperature. Although they were not able to correlate the plant's response under artificial conditions to nature, they did discover that Madia elegans was inhibited in flowering by intermediate day lengths, and was induced to flowering by either short or long days, a rare condition known as ambiphotoperiodism. His PhD work in Delphinium was reported in an abstract in 1946, titled "Polyploidy in the Californian Delphiniums"; here he showed his first interest in the effects of ploidy on adaptation on three species that consisted of races that were diploid and tetraploid, and found that there were no morphological or ecological differences between the diploids and tetraploids. In 1947 he published on problems associated with using leaves for taxonomic purposes in Delphinium.

=== Clarkia ===
In 1946 Lewis was introduced to the annual plant Clarkia as a research subject by G. Ledyard Stebbins, who served on his Ph.D. thesis committee. This suggestion by Stebbins was prophetic as Ford and Gottlieb estimated that as of 2003 there were more than 200 publications on Clarkia.

For the rest of Lewis' career he devoted most of his energies to the genetics, taxonomy, and speciation of plants in the genus. In 1947 he was awarded a one-year postdoctoral fellowship to the John Innes Horticultural Institution in England with Kenneth Mather. While there he worked on the cytogenetics of Clarkia, and published on chromosomal counts in Clarkia in their Annual Report. It was not until 1951 that he published his next paper in Clarkia, which was concerned with the widespread occurrence of supernumerary chromosomes in Clarkia elegans, now known as Clarkia unguiculata. He further noted that members of this species were heterozygous for one or more reciprocal translocations, and that these abnormalities had no genetic effect. However, he hypothesized that the supernumeraries were produced as by-products of translocation heterozygotes, and that the mechanisms producing supernumerary chromosomes could account for the "various chromosome numbers found in this genus."

In 1953 he published four papers which may have been foundational to the rest of his Clarkia career: he not only identified new species-pairs that were morphologically very similar, but he hypothesized a mode of speciation that would account for their origin. One paper described a new species, C. similis, which he hypothesized was a tetraploid between C. modesta and C. epilobioides; all of which were morphologically very similar. Another paper was a taxonomic study that changed some of the nomenclature in Clarkia, combining species of Clarkia with Godetia, and adding four new species. One of the new species was the now famous Clarkia lingulata which was observed to be closely related to C. biloba (this paper was also apparently the first that included his wife as a co-author, a team that would work together for many years). A second new species was C. affinis, an allohexaploid closely related to C. purpurea, an allohexaploid. A third new species was C. prostrata, an allohexapoid closely resembling C. davyi, a tetraploid. The fourth new species was C. imbricata, which was very similar to C. williamsonii.

The third 1953 paper discussed the relationship between changes in the basic chromosome number of Clarkia with Californian habitats. Specifically, he found that increased basal chromosomal numbers in diploid Clarkia were correlated with a xeric habitat, and hypothesized that the genus may have originated at the more mesic ecotone between the Arcto-Tertiary and Madro-Tertiary Floras and spread to more xeric habitats. His fourth paper in 1953 established what he hypothesized to be the primary mode of speciation in Clarkia:

Speciation in Clarkia...has probably resulted from a combination of a variety of factors. Of these perhaps the most important has been the differential accumulation in different populations of adapted gene combinations associated with particular chromosome rearrangements. A by-product of this accumulation of structural rearrangements has been the establishment of strong barriers to gene exchange...These phenomena both suggest that differentiation in Clarkia is often and perhaps usually a rapid process.

In 1954 he published on yet another new species, C. exilis, which was morphologically very similar to C. unguiculata. In this paper he states:

Several new species of Clarkia have recently been described which have a very restricted distribution and which are morphologically very similar to well known and widely ranging species...These sympatric species pairs offer an unusual opportunity for study of species differentiation.

1955 marked the publication of a complete taxonomic revision of the Genus Clarkia. This was followed by an analysis of three subspecies of Clarkia biloba, which ranged mostly from north to south along the Sierran foothills: ssp. brandegeae being northernmost, more central ssp. biloba, with ssp. australis being southernmost; their primary morphological difference being petal color and shape as well as leaf morphology. The fertility amongst the hybrids was high, except that the northern ssp. brandegeae was the least fertile with the other two, probably caused by a chromosomal rearrangement; it was observed that ssp. brandegeae was also morphologically similar to C. dudleyana. The authors concluded that subspeciation in C. biloba did not follow patterns seen in other plants, but was more disjunct involving "barriers to gene exchange due to spacing of the colonies, supplemented in the northern subspecies by a factor which reduces fertility in heterozygotes." This work was then followed by the now famous publication on Clarkia lingulata in 1956 with M. Roberts. C. lingulata is a "sister species" of Clarkia biloba ssp. australis, morphologically almost identical to each other except that C. lingulata does not have notch in its petals, has a low interspecific fertility, and they differ from each other by a translocation, a paracentric inversion, and one additional chromosome; C. lingulata grows at the southernmost extent of ssp. australis range. They concluded that C. lingulata evolved rapidly and recently from C. biloba:

In any event, the transition from one species to the other seems to have been a rapid process which depended only upon the fixation of one or perhaps two chromosomal alterations, which also led to a morphological and perhaps ecological difference. We are inclined to believe in the present case that the stage was set for subsequent differentiation and speciation by the single step of adding a chromosome to the genome of australis. The close relationship of the genomes of C. lingulata and australis, the geographical juxtaposition the two taxa, and the restricted distribution of the former, suggests to us not only a rapid but also a relatively recent origin of C. lingulata from C. biloba australis.

In 1950 Peter H. Raven, at the age of 14, had collected a plant called C. rubicunda. In the course of Harlan and his wife Margaret revising the genus Clarkia they discovered the herbarium specimen collected by Raven. They visited him in 1952 when he was 16, and wanted to know where the collection was made. In 1958 Lewis and Raven published a botanical description of this plant, called C. franciscana, which was morphologically very closely related to C. rubicunda and C. amoena.

Also in 1958 Lewis and Raven published a major paper on the evolution of C. franciscana, and generalized to what was by then a general a pattern of speciation in Clarkia. They concluded that C. franciscana had evolved from Clarkia rubicunda; and they asserted that C. franciscana's origin mirrored a recurring theme in Clarkia of a derived species showing a close morphological similarity to a parental species, the derived species being geographically proximal, but differing from the parent by chromosomal differences and showing interspecific sterility. Further, they hypothesized that such speciation in Clarkia was rapid, and perhaps occurred within the last 12,000 years.

Additionally, they hypothesized that this rapid mode of speciation seen in Clarkia was analogous to a mode of speciation known as quantum evolution:

Several diploid species of Clarkia (Onagraceae) have very limited areas of distribution (Lewis and Lewis, 1955). Most of these grow adjacent to or are surrounded by other closely related species that resemble them so closely that they would ordinarily be regarded as conspecific. Specific status is accorded to them because of reproductive isolation coupled with at least one consistent difference in external morphology. This pattern recurs with sufficient constancy to suggest that the various examples have a common explanation, with similar factors operating in each instance. This pattern suggests to us a rapid shift of the adaptive mode, such as Simpson (1944) termed quantum evolution, at the diploid specific level. The purpose of this paper is to illustrate this process by a consideration of the mode of origin of a narrow serpentine endemic, Clarkia franciscana Lewis and Raven (1958)...The repeated occurrence of the same pattern of differentiation in Clarkia suggests that a rapid reorganization of chromosomes has been an important mode of evolution in the genus. This rapid reorganization of the chromosomes is comparable to the systemic mutations proposed by Goldschmidt as a mechanism of macroevolution. In Clarkia, we have not observed marked changes in physiology and pattern of development that could be described as macroevolution. Reorganization of the genomes may, however, set the stage for subsequent evolution along a very different course from that of the ancestral populations.

Clarkia has a number of polyploid species, and one, Clarkia tenella, is a tetraploid located in Chile and Argentina; it is the only member of Clarkia not found in Western North America. Raven and Lewis reported in 1959 that C. tenella is closely related to C. davyi, which is a tetraploid found on sea bluffs of northern and north-central California. They hypothesized that Clarkia tenella and Clarkia davyi arose in from a common allotetraploid ancestor in North America and evolved into xeric habitats in the late Cenozoic; the tetraploid ancestor was then introduced into South America by long-distance dispersal. This work was extended by studies in 1965 and 1966. Lewis and Moore reported that Clarkia tenella was divided into four subspecies: ssp. araucana, the most southerly in western Argentina; restricted ssp. tenuifolia; widespread ssp. tenella, and ssp. ambigua. Hybrids between them were highly heterozygous for many translocations and had greatly reduced pollen fertility. They concluded that ssp. araucana was most closely related to the original ancestral Clarkia located to South America. It gave rise to ssp. tenuifolia, which gave rise to the xeric adapted ssp. tenella. One race of ssp. araucana, a tetraploid missing two chromosomes, is the newest and is the "only known example in Clarkia of a derivative occupying more mesic conditions than its progenitor."

In 1959 Lewis published a paper on the nature of what constitutes a species in flowering plants. Citing examples from Salvia, Delphinium, and Clarkia, he stated:

The examples I have given illustrate my earlier point that reproductive isolation does not necessarily coincide with speciation. Gene exchange between species must be restricted if they are to maintain genetic integrity, but, as we have seen, such restriction does not necessarily imply genetic independence to a degree where variation for subsequent evolution is not available through gene exchange between sympatric species. On the other hand, fortuitous or adaptive differentiation for chromosomal alterations or genetic incompatibility has, in many groups of plants, let to reproductive isolation in the absence of genetic differentiation commensurate with that associated with species. It is not my intention to deny a correlation which obviously exists or to minimize the role of reproductive isolation isolation in species formation. I do, however, wish to emphasize that among plants this correlation is far from unity, except, perhaps, for certain groups. This does not mean that reproductive isolation is not taxonomically important, but that alone it does not necessarily provide the only, or the best, basis for delimiting species in all groups of organisms...This stands in marked contrast to the situation in many groups of animals in which reproductive isolation seems to have a positive selective value in areas where genetically differentiated groups overlap (see Dobzhansky, 1951, chap 7)

Lewis continued his interest in C. lingulata's adaptedness relative to C. biloba. In 1961 he reported that in artificially mixed populations established south of either species' range, with C. biloba being in excess, C. lingulata died out. This confirmed his hypothesis that C. lingulata must have been established separately from C. biloba. Also, he found that C. lingulata flowered two weeks earlier than C. biloba. He believed that this would be an advantage in the xeric conditions at the species' extreme southern margin, and that C. lingulata would prevail under increasingly xeric conditions in competition with C. biloba.

In 1962 Lewis published a more lengthy proposal for "catastrophic selection" as the primary mode of speciation in Clarkia:

...catastrophic selection in ecologically marginal populations has had a prominent role in speciation in the genus Clarkia.The following observations compellingly suggest that speciation at the diploid level in this genus ordinarily involves a rapid reorganization of the genome associated with ecological differentiation, a reorganization that involves an intermediate stage of low fertility: Closely related pairs of species bear a relationship of parent to offspring and not one of siblings. They invariably differ by several gross structural rearrangements of the chromosomes, and sometimes by a change in basic number; as a consequence, hybrids between them are essentially sterile. Recent derivatives occur at the margin of distribution of the parental species, but the two species are unable to form stable mixed populations because sterile hybrids are formed as readily as intraspecific progenies; the derivative populations must, therefore, have arisen in isolation. In all instances, derivative species occupy ecologically different, invariably more xeric, habitats than their progenitors.

Lewis reported in 1965 on the evolution of self-pollination in Clarkia xantiana. In this species all populations were out-crossers, except two populations located in an area subject to periodic and exceptional drought; these same two populations were found to be self-pollinated. Further, one of the populations has pink flowers, the normal color, and the second has white flowers. Also, the pink-flowered selfer is inter-fertile with outcrossing populations, while the white flowered self-pollinated population differs from the others by a translocation and reduced fertility. He argued that the self-pollinated populations arose from catastrophic selection; the self-pollinators being able to survive extremely reduced population sizes; they concluded that the white flowered population was a derivative of the pink flowered selfing population.

In 1966 Lewis expanded the concept of catastrophic selection to "saltational speciation" to all flowering plants:

Saltational speciation in flowering plants is required as an explanation only for the relationships between particular populations of annuals that have been studied intensively. by reasonable extrapolation, however, it appears to be the prevalent mode of speciation in many herbaceous genera and to have had a significant role in the evolution of woody plants

In 1968 Wedberg and Lewis reported on the distribution of widespread translocation heterozygosity and supernumerary chromosomes in C. williamsonii. They found that there was a correlation between translocation heterozygosity and supernumerary chromosomes and habitat. Populations in the yellow pine forest consistently had low frequencies of translocation heterozygosity and low frequencies of supernumerary chromosomes. Populations in foothill woodlands had high frequencies of both chromosomal types. They concluded that translocation heterozygosity had an adaptive role in woodland habitats but not at the higher elevations; it was theorized that translocation heterozygosity was helping to preserve genetic heterozygosity under conditions of enforced inbreeding that would occur at low elevations from periodic drought. The supernumerary chromosomes could have provided either more genetic variability or have been a byproduct of translocation heterozygosity, and occur as a matter of chance.

Lewis summarized the ecological relationships in Clarkia between habitat and chromosomal variation in a paper published in 1969. He reviewed the association with translocation heterozygosity and habitat in C. williamsonii; the correlation with basic chromosome number with mesic/xeric habitats in many species of Clarkia; and the origin of C. lingulata from C. biloba.

In a continuing interest in Clarkia phylogeny, Lewis published a paper in 1971 on species relationships using pollen grains. The pollen grains separated Clarkia into a few of the same groups (sections) as was previously determined using chromosomes and morphology. However, they cautioned against using some characters in the absence of a well-documented phylogeny.

Lewis followed with a 1973 paper in which he established five expectations that would follow from his theory of saltational speciation, and he reviewed them for 12 parent/"neospecies" pairs. He found that C. lingulata showed the best fit with his five expectations.

In 1986 Lewis and Holsinger established the creation of a new "Section" and "Subsection" in the genus Clarkia. The Section was "Sympherica", whose name was taken from the Greek for "the usefulness this group has had in several evolutionary studies." They went on to cite work by Leslie D. Gottlieb.

Harlan Lewis at UCLA greenhouse

=== Delphinium ===
Throughout much of his career Lewis worked on the genus Delphinium in addition to his work on Clarkia. His PhD work in Delphinium was reported in an abstract in 1946, titled "Polyploidy in the Californian Delphiniums"; here he showed his first interest in the effects of ploidy on adaptation in three species (D. hanseni, D. gypsophilum, and D. variegatum) that consisted of races that were diploid and tetraploid, and found that there were no morphological or ecological differences between the diploids and tetraploids. In 1947 he also published on the problems associated with using leaves for taxonomic purposes in Delphinium; these and other problems with determining species differences were later reported in a 1954 taxonomic revision of the Californian genus. This report also included results of an earlier study that determined chromosome numbers of all Californian species; they reported that all species were diploids except three, which had mixed races of diploids and tetraploids, as they reported earlier in 1946.

In 1952 Carl Epling and Lewis reported on the ecology of the genus with respect to its adaptation to drought. They reported that its perennial habit could be put into dormancy from essentially any growth stage, and "once initiated is not broken until the following season." Further, different individuals within a population could remain or become dormant while others completed a growth cycle. Consequently, "An increase of genotypes adapted to the xeric aspects of a given site would be expected as a result of prolonged drought..."

In 1959 Lewis and Epling reported on a rapid speciation event at the diploid level by hybridization. They asserted that D. gypsophilum arose from the hybridization of D. recurvatum and D. hesperium in a single generation; and presented evidence that D. gypsophilum was not only intermediate in morphology, but occupied an ecological zone intermediate between the two parents. Further, all the species were interfertile. They also concluded that this mode of speciation was not unique in Delphinium.

In 1966 argued that diploids and their autopolyploid derivatives should be considered as belonging to one species. He used examples to support this from the diploid and tetraploid races of D. hanseni, D. gypsophilum, and D. variegatum.

=== Other species ===
Lewis' first publication was with Carl Epling in 1940 which covered the distributions of three species pairs in Californian chaparral and coastal sage scrub communities. In this paper he shows his first interest in plant distributions as they relate to speciation. His next publications with Epling followed in 1942. One was taxonomic in nature, and concerned itself with the genus Monarda in the Lamiaceae. His second paper in 1942 concerned itself with the distributions of the chaparral and coastal sage scrub communities in cis-montane California, and they concluded that these two communities had their centers of distribution in San Diego County, and probably entered the Southwestern United States from the North American Plateau.

In 1951 Lewis and Snow published a small article on taxonomic problems in Eschscholtzia, and advocated the use of cytogenetics to solve some of its taxonomic problems. He apparently never followed up on this work.

Lewis published on chromosome numbers in Mentzelia (Loasaceae), as well as a taxonomic revision of the genus Trichostema (Lamiaceae) including chromosome counts.

In 1958 Lewis, Raven and others published on a chromosomal analysis of several taxa in the Onagraceae "because we have been curious to know the pattern of chromosome differentiation in the family," and they concluded that as a result of their analysis the suggested a taxonomic reevaluation of several taxa.

Lewis and Epling published a paper in 1960 on blue and white flowered polymorphisms in Linanthus parryae (Polemoniaceae). The persistence of this polymorphism over time has been a puzzle for many years, and was studied by prominent geneticists such as Sewall Wright and Theodosius Dobzhansky, going back to 1942; and as recently as 2007. Epling and Lewis found that the polymorphisms were very stable over a 15-year period, despite changes in plant densities. Further, they reported that there was a large seed bank of ungerminated seeds, and these seeds had a variable release from dormancy. Consequently, the effective "breeding group" was very large, and that any selective advantage of the flower colors "precluded significant changes in pattern during 15 seasons."

In an attempt to understand the structure of chromosomes that tends to favor the formation of translocation heterozygotes, Lewis and Raven analayzed metaphase chromosomes from species throughout the Onagraceae, including taxa with and without translocation heterozygotes. They found that those genera that had translocation heterozygotes all had metaphase chromosomes with particular characteristics.

In 1964 Lewis published an extensive analysis of species in the genus Gayophytum (Onagraceae) distributed in the western U.S. and Chile. Their analysis included morphology, cytogenetics, ecology, and taxonomy.

=== Legacy ===
Carl Epling named a new Genus in the Labiatae after Harlan Lewis, called Harlanlewisia. He said "I take pleasure and satisfaction in naming this genus in honor of Professor Harlan Lewis of the University of California, whose brilliant and definitive analyses of the taxonomy and evolution of Clarkia-Godetia are well known and whose first contribution to taxonomy was a revision of the Labiate genus Trichostemma."

== See also ==
- Catastrophism
- History of evolutionary thought
- History of molecular evolution
- Molecular evolution
- Phyletic gradualism
- Rapid modes of evolution
- Mutationism
- Quantum evolution
