= Peter H. Raven =

American botanist (1936–2026)

Peter Raven
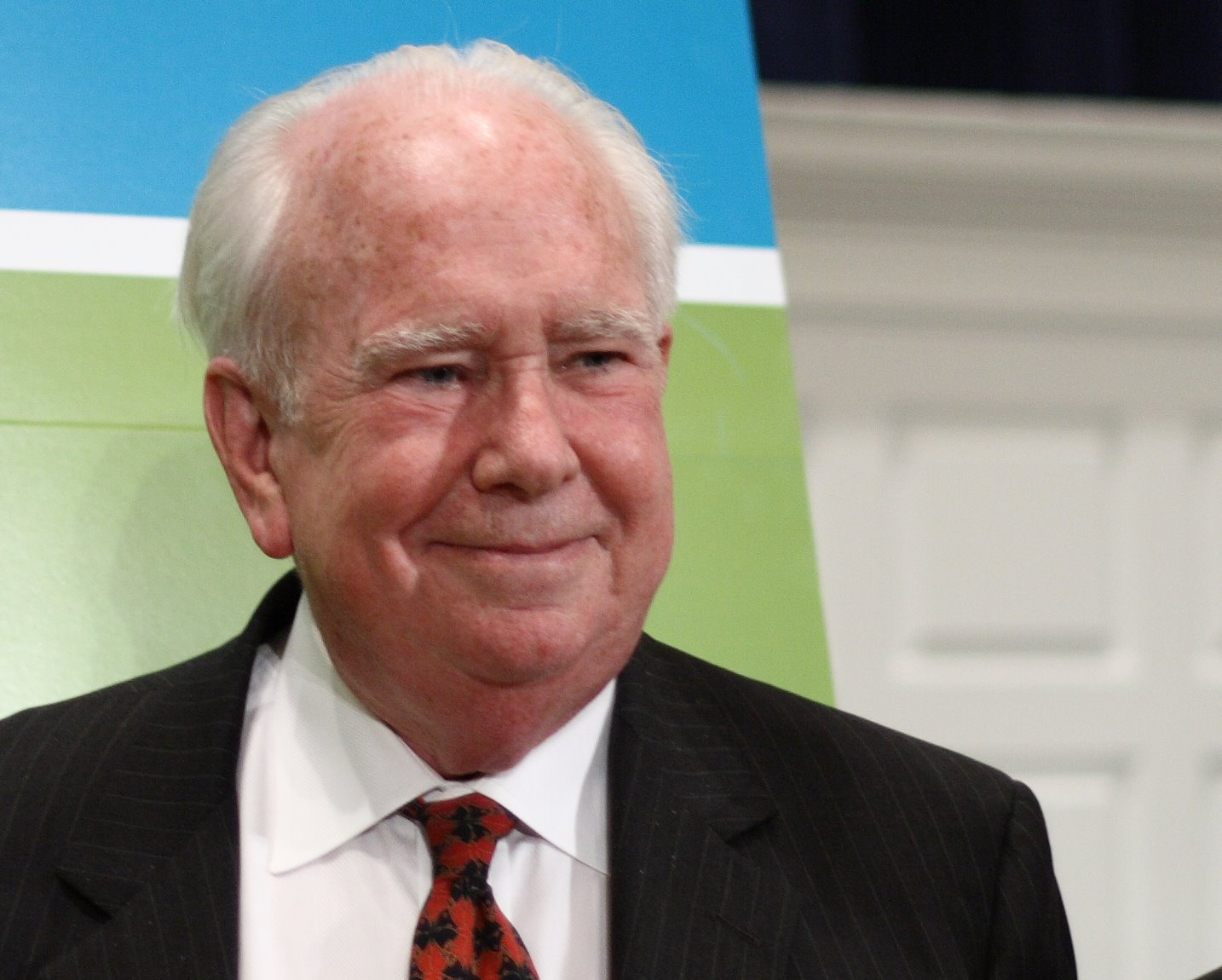
- Raven after receiving the Addison Emery Verrill Medal, 2007
- Born: Peter Hamilton Raven; June 13, 1936; Shanghai, China
- Died: April 25, 2026 (aged 89); St. Louis, Missouri, U.S.
- Education: University of California, Berkeley; University of California, Los Angeles
- Spouses: Sally Barrett (m. 1958; died 1968) Tamra Engelhorn (m. 1968; div. 1995) Kathryn Fish (m. 1996; div. 2000) Patricia Duncan (m. 2001)
- Children: 4
- Awards: See Awards and honors
- Scientific career
- Fields: Botany, Evolutionary biology, Biodiversity
- Workplaces: Stanford University; Missouri Botanical Garden; Washington University in St. Louis
- Doctoral students: Dennis E. Breedlove; Warren L. Wagner
- Author abbrev. (botany): P.H.Raven

Peter Hamilton Raven (June 13, 1936 – April 25, 2026) was an American botanist, environmentalist, and the longtime director and president of the Missouri Botanical Garden.

== Early life ==
On June 13, 1936, Raven was born in Shanghai, China, to American parents, Walter Francis Raven and Isabelle Marion Breen. His father's uncle Frank Jay Raven was, for a time, one of the wealthiest Americans in China but was later jailed in a banking scandal. That incident and Japanese aggression in China led the Raven family to return to San Francisco, California, in the late 1930s.

Raven became interested in beetles and plants from an early age, becoming a member of the California Academy of Sciences and the Sierra Club while still a youth. He went on to graduate with a BSc in biology from the University of California, Berkeley, in 1957 and a Ph.D. in botany from the University of California, Los Angeles, in 1960.

== Career ==
After teaching at Stanford University, Raven went on to become Director of the Missouri Botanical Garden in 1971. In 2006, his position was renamed President and Director. Raven announced his plans to retire in 2011, to coincide with his 75th birthday and his 40th year at the garden. Peter Wyse Jackson was appointed Raven's successor at the Missouri Botanical Garden in September 2010.

Raven is possibly best known for his work "Butterflies and Plants: A Study in Coevolution", published in the journal Evolution in 1964, which he coauthored with Paul R. Ehrlich. Since then he has authored numerous scientific and popular papers, many on the evening primrose family, Onagraceae. Raven is also an author of the widely used textbook Biology of Plants, now in its eighth edition, coauthored with Ray F. Evert and Susan E. Eichhorn (both of University of Wisconsin–Madison).

He was a frequent speaker on the need for biodiversity and species conservation.

In 2000, the American Society of Plant Taxonomists established the Peter Raven Award in his honor to be conferred to authors with outstanding contributions to plant taxonomy and "for exceptional efforts at outreach to non-scientists".

Raven served on the advisory council of CRDF Global. He served on the board of trustees for Science Service, now known as Society for Science, from 1993 to 1996.

== Research ==
Raven published more than 700 articles, books and monographs covering topics in evolution, taxonomy and systematics, biogeography, coevolution, plant conservation, ethnobotany, and public policy, including several text books.

During his early years he was associated with and led Sierra Club outings for several weeks at a time, after which he published "Base Camp Reports." Published from 1950 to 1956, these reports covered a wide range of subjects, including plant lists, insects, and ecology. His first such report, at the age of 14, summarized 506 plant collections representing 337 species collected in the Sierra Nevada Mountains in Inyo and Fresno Counties. G. Ledyard Stebbins was a counselor on this particular trip, identified by Raven as Prof. G. L. "Led" Stebbins.

During this time he also published on new weed species and other plants found in and around San Francisco as well as the Sierra Nevada Mountains.

In 1950, Raven, at the age of 14, had collected a plant called Clarkia rubicunda. In the early 1950s, in the course of revising the genus Clarkia Harlan Lewis and his wife Margaret Lewis discovered the herbarium specimen collected by Raven. They visited him in 1952 when he was 16, and wanted to know where the collection was made. Lewis eventually located the new species, and in 1958 Lewis and Raven published a botanical description of this plant, called C. franciscana, which was morphologically very closely related to C. rubicunda and C. amoena.

Many of Raven's early botanical and entomological collections are housed at the California Academy of Sciences herbarium (CAS). His approximately 45,000 collections span seven decades from the 1950s through to the 2010s, with the bulk collected from the 1950s to the 1970s, and they are deposited in over 200 institutions.

=== Evolution ===
While a graduate student at the University of California, Los Angeles, Raven and Harlan Lewis published a major paper in 1958 on the evolution of C. franciscana, and generalized to what was by then a general a pattern of speciation in Clarkia. They concluded that C. franciscana had evolved from Clarkia rubicunda; and they asserted that C. franciscana's origin mirrored a recurring theme in Clarkia of a derived species showing a close morphological similarity to a parental species, the derived species being geographically proximal, but differing from the parent by chromosomal differences and showing interspecific sterility. Further, they hypothesized that such speciation in Clarkia was rapid and perhaps occurred within the last 12,000 years.

Additionally, they hypothesized that this rapid mode of speciation seen in Clarkia was analogous to a mode of speciation known as quantum evolution.

Following his early publication in 1958 on evolution of C. franciscana, Raven went on to publish many papers on evolutionary topics. While at Stanford University, with Paul R. Ehrlich, he coined the term coevolution after a 1964 review of butterflies and their food plants.

In a 1969 paper Ehrlich and Raven were also critical of the idea that the definition of species as advocated by Ernst Mayr, Theodosius Dobzhansky, and G. Ledyard Stebbins had very little meaning for plants.

In 1978, Sussman and Raven advanced the idea that nonflying mammals, such as primates and marsupials, could have been significant pollinators but were outcompeted by nectar-feeding birds and bats. Any coevolved relationships between flowering plant species and non-flying mammal pollinators that persist at the present would appear to be "living fossils, which have a great deal to tell us about the evolution of both the mammals, including some of our antecedents, and of the flowering plants."

Raven wrote a review of the plant population data as of 1979, and identified several themes that he felt had potential for future research, including the above theme of the species problem. He went on to assert that developmental biology would be more important in the future He advocated another theme, that being that funding should be provided for study on a few species rather than spread amongst many in order to solve population biology problems:

In 1980, Raven continued discussing problems associated with defining species in plants. He discussed the widespread ability of plant species to hybridize, especially in perennial plants, and the historical observations of such back to 1717. He used as examples of perennial plants in the genera Epilobium, Scaevola, Bidens, and Ceanothus as examples of plants that appeared to use hybridization as a means to adapting to new environments. He stated "If the hybrids are particularly favored in specific ecological situations, asexual reproduction, polyploidy, or simply autogamy may favor the perpetuation of specific genotypes through a narrowing of the spectrum of genetic recombination characteristic of the population. No general conclusions about the most appropriate way to treat these populations taxonomically appear to be possible." In annual plants, using examples from Clarkia, he asserted that several species of Clarkia often occur sympatrically, yet hybrids are very rare in the wild," and that much of the sterility is due to chromosomal repatterning between species."

In 1980, Raven and coauthors reviewed the literature concerning fungal symbiosis in vascular plants. They reviewed two kinds of fungal-plant associations: ectomycorrhizal and endomycorrhizal. They reported that endomycorrhizal fungi, which penetrate plant cells, are found in 80% of all vascular plants, including ferns, gymnosperms, and angiosperms, and are found in forests of high species richness. On the other hand, ectomycorrhizal fungi, which do not penetrate plant cells, occur in forests of low species richness, are usually in temperate forests, or infertile soils of the tropics. Further, they hypothesized that ectomycorrhizal forests have expanded through the Middle Cretaceous at the expense of endomycorrhizal forests.

Raven's Ph.D. thesis was on a genus within the Onagraceae, and his interest on the evolution of plants within this family as well as the Myrtales runs through his entire career. In 1988, he published a review of the Onagraceae, covering its taxonomy, evolution, cytogenetics, anatomy, breeding systems, and geographic distribution. He asserted that the family was the best known plant family of its size, and proposed that further studies of the family would be useful in understanding of "variation and evolution of plants in the future."

=== Biogeography ===
Raven showed an early interest in plant disjunctions prior to the wide acceptance of plate tectonic theory of the late 1960s, and was an early adopter of plate tectonics in explaining plant disjunctions by the early 1970s.

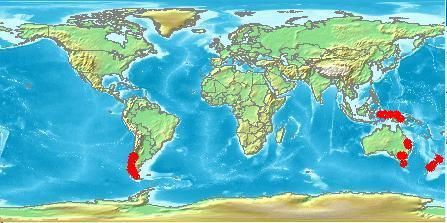
The Nothofagus plant genus illustrates Gondwanan distribution, having descended from the supercontinent and existing in present-day Australia, New Zealand, New Caledonia, and the Southern Cone. Fossils have also recently been found in Antarctica.

In 1963, Raven published a review of amphitropical distributions of plant species in North and South America. He divided species into three groups: biopolar or high-latitude species, temperate species, and desert species.

In 1974, with Daniel I. Axelrod, Raven published an extensive article on plant and animal biogeography in the context of plate tectonics. They stated that the new plate tectonic theory "did not require any new modifications of previously established major principles of evolution...however there were new principles of biogeography..."

In 1978, again with Axelrod, they published on the origin and complexity of Californian flora. They reviewed that the flora of California consisted of "northern, temperate elements and xeric, southern elements, and is characterized by a high degree of endemism." They proposed that the reasons for the large number of species in the state as well as the endemics is due to the favorable climate that has prevailed in California for most of the Tertiary, as well as the recent elevation of the Sierra Nevada and other ranges, together with: "The concomitant development of a cold off-shore current which ultimately resulted in the development of a mediterranean, summer-dry climate during the past million years...The endemics of California are a mixture of relicts and newly produced species...and it is the latter that have contributed most to the size of the flora and to the high proportion of endemism in it."

Raven and Axelrod wrote a paper in 1985 on the origin of the Cordilleran flora, a region bounded by the east slope of the Sierra Nevada and Transverse Ranges and Peninsular Ranges of California to the eastern front of the Rocky Mountains, north to the Snake River Plain-western Wyoming, and south to central Arizona-New Mexico.

In 1996 Raven, Axelrod, and Al-Shehbaz wrote a paper on the history of the modern flora of China, Europe, and the continental United States. They said that the three regions have approximately the same geographic area, yet China has two times the number of species as the United States, and three times as many as Europe. They asserted that all three regions had essentially the same flora as of 15 million years ago, but China came to possess the most species because of three reasons. First, China has a tropical rain forest. Second, there is an unbroken gradient of vegetation from the tropical rain forest to "boreal coniferous forests that has persisted and afforded habitats characterized by equable climates during the last 15 million years, when massive extinctions were taking place elsewhere in the Northern Hemisphere...such continuity is interrupted in North America by the Gulf of Mexico and in Europe by the Alps, the Mediterranean, and the Sahara Desert." The third reason was due to the impact of the Indian subcontinent with Asia starting 50 million years ago, making a "highly dissected, elevated geography."

=== Taxonomy/systematics/floras ===
Raven produced a wide variety of works in the area of plant systematics. Most of them are related to the plant family Onagraceae. In 1969 he published a 235-page report on Camissonia; In 1976 he, along with his wife at the time Tamara Engelhorn, published a 321-page monograph on Epilobium in Australasia; an embryological analysis of species in the Myrtales; In 1992, a 209-page monograph on the systematics of Epilobium in China; in 1997 a 234-page monograph on the systematics of Oenothera; and in 2007 a 240-page monograph on a reclassification of the Onagraceae. And in 1981 he published a 1,049 page monograph on the systematics of Legumes.

He also published a number of books (Floras) devoted to the systematics of plants found in particular regions. These include a 1966 book on the native shrubs of Southern California; a 1966 flora on the Santa Monica Mountains in California; and, with various editors and authors, an ongoing 33 volume set (to date) on the flora of China, organized by plant family.

=== Ethnobotany ===
Raven (along with Dennis E. Breedlove, his former PhD student) was a collaborator on a team led by Brent Berlin that published a seminal work on the classification of plants by the Tzeltal Mayan-speaking people of Highland Chiapas. They concluded that plant, as well as animal, descriptions could be grouped into five different hierarchical "taxonomic ethnobiological categories"; these included 1.) "unique beginner," such as plants and animals, 2.) "life form", such as tree, vine, bird, grass, mammal, etc.; 3.) the largest category, consisting usually of ~500 taxa, is "generic", and consists of names such as oak, pine, catfish, perch, and robin. Further, some "generics" were not included with in the classification of "life forms", and were called "aberrant". These included names such as cactus, bamboo, pineapple, platypus, etc., and were often of economic value—Agave, bean, and corn as examples. Two other taxa were called "specific" and "varietal," and were generally less numerous. Examples of "specific" include blue spruce, white fir, and post oak, and examples of "varietal" included baby beans, button beans, etc.

Berlin, Breedlove and Raven later extended their analysis of plants and animals to other indigenous peoples including the Hanunoo speaking people of the island of Mindoro, Philippines; the Karam of Papua New Guinea; the Cantonese speaking boat people of Castle Peak Bay, Hong Kong; the Navajo of the Southwestern United States; the Fore people of Papua New Guinea; the Guaraní people of South America; and the Nahuatl speaking people of Mexico, and concluded that their five to six taxonomic ethnobiological categories were generalizable.

== Personal life and death ==
From 1996 to 2000, Raven was married to Kathryn Fish, who served as the director of public policy for Monsanto. The couple met while both were serving on an environmental advisory committee for Monsanto.

Raven died on April 25, 2026, at the age of 89.

== Awards and honors ==
- American Society of Plant Biologists Leadership in Science Public Service Award, 2012
- William L. Brown Award for Excellence in Genetic Resource Conservation, 2010
- Arthur Hoyt Scott Medal 2009, awarded by the Scott Arboretum of Swarthmore College
- ANZAAS Medal, 2004
- International Cosmos Prize, 2003
- Veitch Memorial Medal, 2003
- U.S. National Medal of Science recipient, 2000
- Golden Plate Award of the American Academy of Achievement, 2000
- Induction into the St. Louis Walk of Fame, 1995
- Tyler Prize for Environmental Achievement, 1994
- Volvo Environment Prize winner, 1992
- The Delmer S. Fahrney Medal in 1989
- Member of the American Philosophical Society, 1988
- International Prize for Biology winner, 1986
- Catharine T. MacArthur Foundation Fellowship, 1985
- Member of the United States National Academy of Sciences, 1977
- Member of the American Academy of Arts and Sciences, 1977
- Foreign Member of the Linnean Society of London (FMLS)
- Honorary Member of the American Society of Landscape Architects
- Elected as a Corresponding Fellow to the Australian Academy of Science
- Member of President Bill Clinton's Committee of Advisors on Science and Technology
- Former Home Secretary of the U.S. National Academy of Sciences
- Former President of Sigma Xi
- Engler Medal winner
- Former President of the American Association for the Advancement of Science
- Named a Hero for the Planet by TIME magazine
- Member of National Geographic Society board of trustees
- Honorary Doctor of Science Harvard University May 29, 2014

== Taxa named after Peter H. Raven ==
Over 50 plant species and other taxa have been named in honor of Raven.

=== Genera ===
- Megacorax is a genus of flowering plants from Mexico, belonging to the family Onagraceae and published in 2002.
- Oenothera sect. Ravenia, comprising two Mexican species, named by American botanist Warren Wagner.
- Zapoteca subgen. Ravenia, comprising two species from Mexico and Belize, named by Mexican botanist Héctor Manuel Hernández.

=== Species and subspecies ===
- The lichen species Ocellularia raveniana from Sri Lanka.
- Allium ravenii, a bulbous geophyte species from Kazakhstan.
- Amorphophallus ravenii, a tuberous plant in the arum family native to Laos.
- Anthurium ravenii, a tropical epiphytic aroid from Central America.
- Arctostaphylos montana subsp. ravenii, the current name for Arctostaphylos hookeri subsp. ravenii, an endangered shrub from San Francisco, California, which Raven himself rediscovered in the wild in 1952.
- Arracacia ravenii, a high-elevation perennial species in the family Apiaceae from southern Mexico.
- Astragalus ravenii from the high Sierra of California, where Raven's 1956 specimen is the holotype.
- Begonia ravenii, a perennial tuberous herb from Taiwan.
- Berberis ravenii, a small evergreen shrub from Taiwan.
- Calathea ravenii, a perennial herb from Central America.
- Cardamine flaccida subsp. ravenii, a perennial herb from Chiapas, Mexico. The holotype was collected in 1965 by Raven and Dennis E. Breedlove.
- Ceroxylon ravenii, a Peruvian acaulescent dioecious palm.
- Dendropanax ravenii, a shrub endemic to Costa Rica.
- Dioscorea ravenii, a neotropical tuber.
- Encilia ravenii, a small shrub from Baja California.
- Epilobium ravenii, a North American herb that Raven himself had previously studied.
- Eugenia ravenii, a tree around 13 m tall endemic to Chiapas, Mexico.
- Eupatorium ravenii, formerly Koanophyllon ravenii, a shurb from Chiapas, Mexico. The holotype was collected in 1965 by Raven and Dennis E. Breedlove.
- Fuchsia ravenii, a shrub found in the Sierra Madre, Oaxaca, Mexico.
- Haplopappus ravenii (now Xanthisma gracile), an annual herbaceous daisy in the southwestern USA and Mexico.
- Lomatium ravenii, a perennial herb from the western USA. Raven and Otto Solbrig collected a specimen of it in 1958 which led to its description the following year.
- Zapoteca ravenii, a legume shrub from Mexico and Belize.

== Works ==
- Paul R. Ehrlich and Peter H. Raven (1964), "Butterflies and Plants: A Study in Coevolution", Evolution, 18: 586–608.
- Peter H. Raven and Helena Curtis (1970), Biology of Plants, New York: Worth Publishing. [Early presentation of five-kingdom system.]
