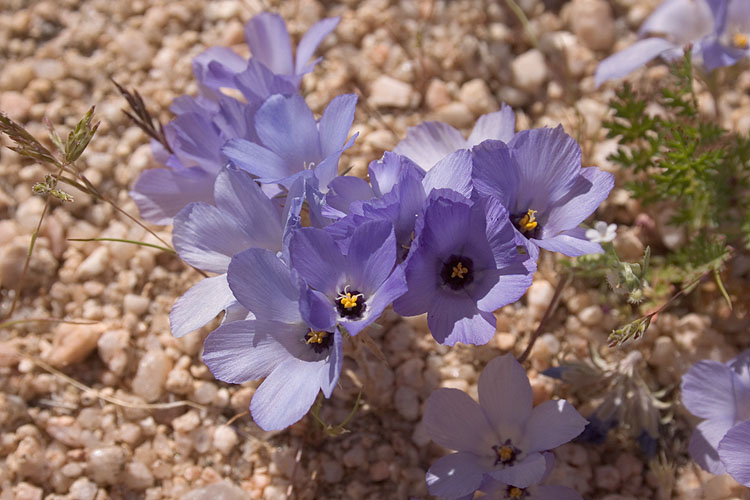

Scientific classification
- Kingdom: Plantae
- Clade: Tracheophytes
- Clade: Angiosperms
- Clade: Eudicots
- Clade: Asterids
- Order: Ericales
- Family: Polemoniaceae
- Genus: Linanthus
- Species: L. parryae

Binomial name
- Linanthus parryae (A.Gray) Greene

= Linanthus parryae =

Species of flowering plant

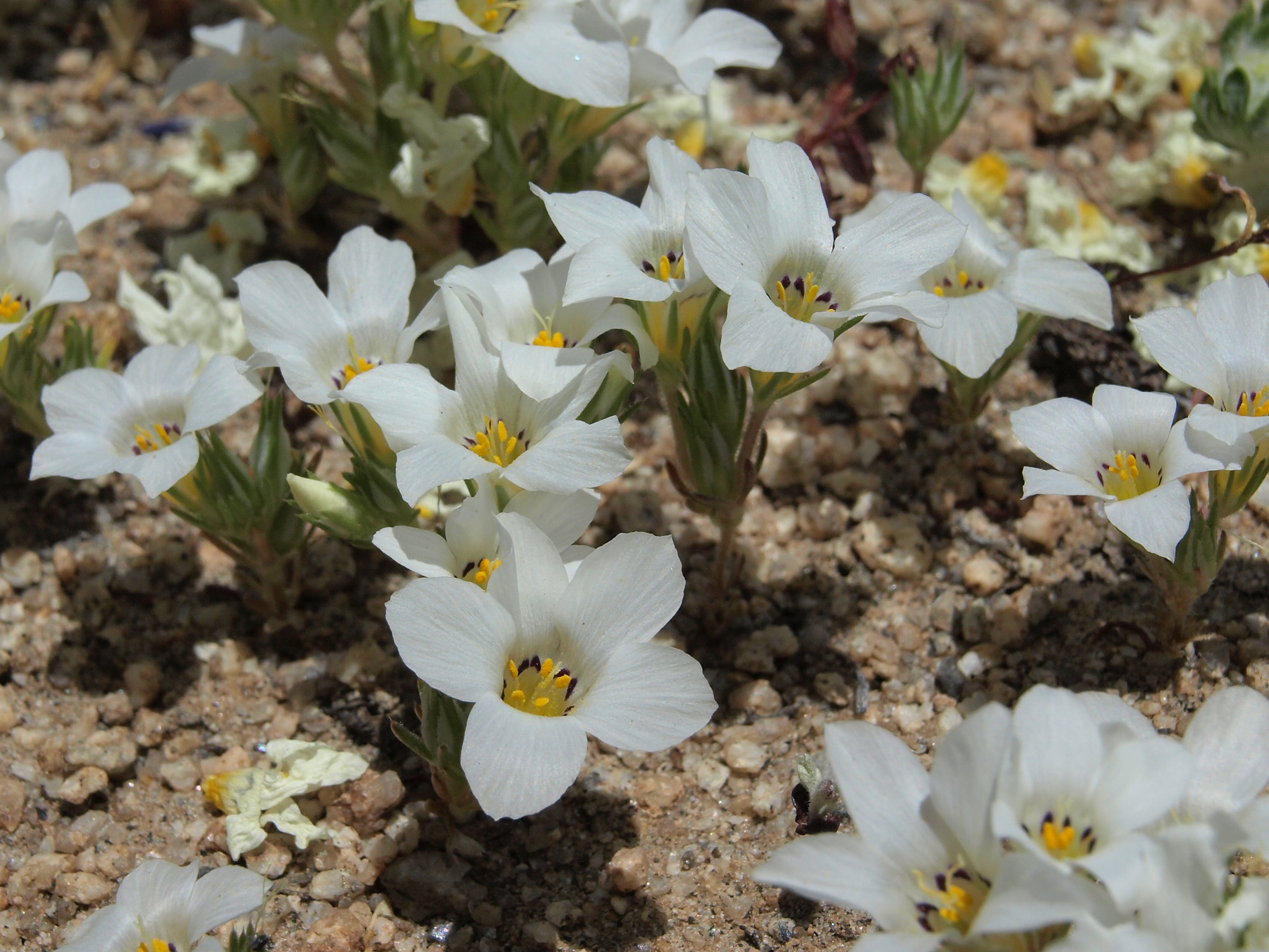
Sand blossoms, Linanthus parryae. Owens Valley, 2017

Linanthus parryae is a species of flowering plant in the phlox family known by the common name sandblossoms. It is native to the western United States. In California, it grows in several regions from the Central Valley to the Sierra Nevada foothills and the Mojave Desert. It occurs in sandy, open, flat areas.

It is a petite annual herb producing short stems just a few centimeters tall, surrounded by hairy, needle-lobed leaves. The inflorescence, which often appears to sit directly on the ground tucked amidst the leaves, is a cluster of funnel-shaped flowers about a centimeter wide. The flowers are self-incompatible and are cross-pollinated exclusively by a Melyrid beetle, Trichochorous sp. Seeds germinate after winter rains in January to February, producing flowering plants in April and shedding seeds in May to June. Seeds are passively dispersed and remain viable for at least seven years, with little or no germination in dry years.

The flowers can be white or blue/purple. Flower color is mainly controlled by a single gene locus, with the allele for white flowers being recessive and the alleles of the blue flower being dominant. Most populations have predominantly white flowers, with some populations mainly blue flowers, and some others with both blue and white flowered plants occurring at intermediate frequencies. The proportions of each color remain quite stable over time and in some locations there are sharp transitions from blue to white flowered populations. This uncommon phenomenon has made this species a model organism in studies of genetic variation.

For many decades a long line of geneticists and botanists, including Sewall Wright, Carl Epling, Harlan Lewis and T. G. Dobzhansky, have studied populations of this flower to determine the factors that influence this polymorphism. Color frequencies may vary for many reasons, including genetic drift and pure natural selection. Wright built his isolation by distance and Shifting Balance theories on genetic drift in this flower using data collected by Epling and Dobzhansky in the Mojave Desert. More recent studies place greater emphasis on the effects of natural selection on color frequency.
