= Margaret Lewis =

Margaret Lewis may refer to:

- Margaret Lewis (singer-songwriter) (c. 1941–2019), country music/rockabilly singer/songwriter
- Margaret Ensign Lewis (1919–2017), American botanist
- Margaret S. Lewis (born 1954), Wisconsin politician
- Margaret Reed Lewis (1881–1970), American biologist
- Marg Lewis, Australian politician
