= Slender clarkia =

Slender clarkia is a common name for several plants and may refer to:

- Clarkia exilis, endemic to a small area in California northeast of Bakersfield
- Clarkia gracilis, native to California, Oregon, and Washington
