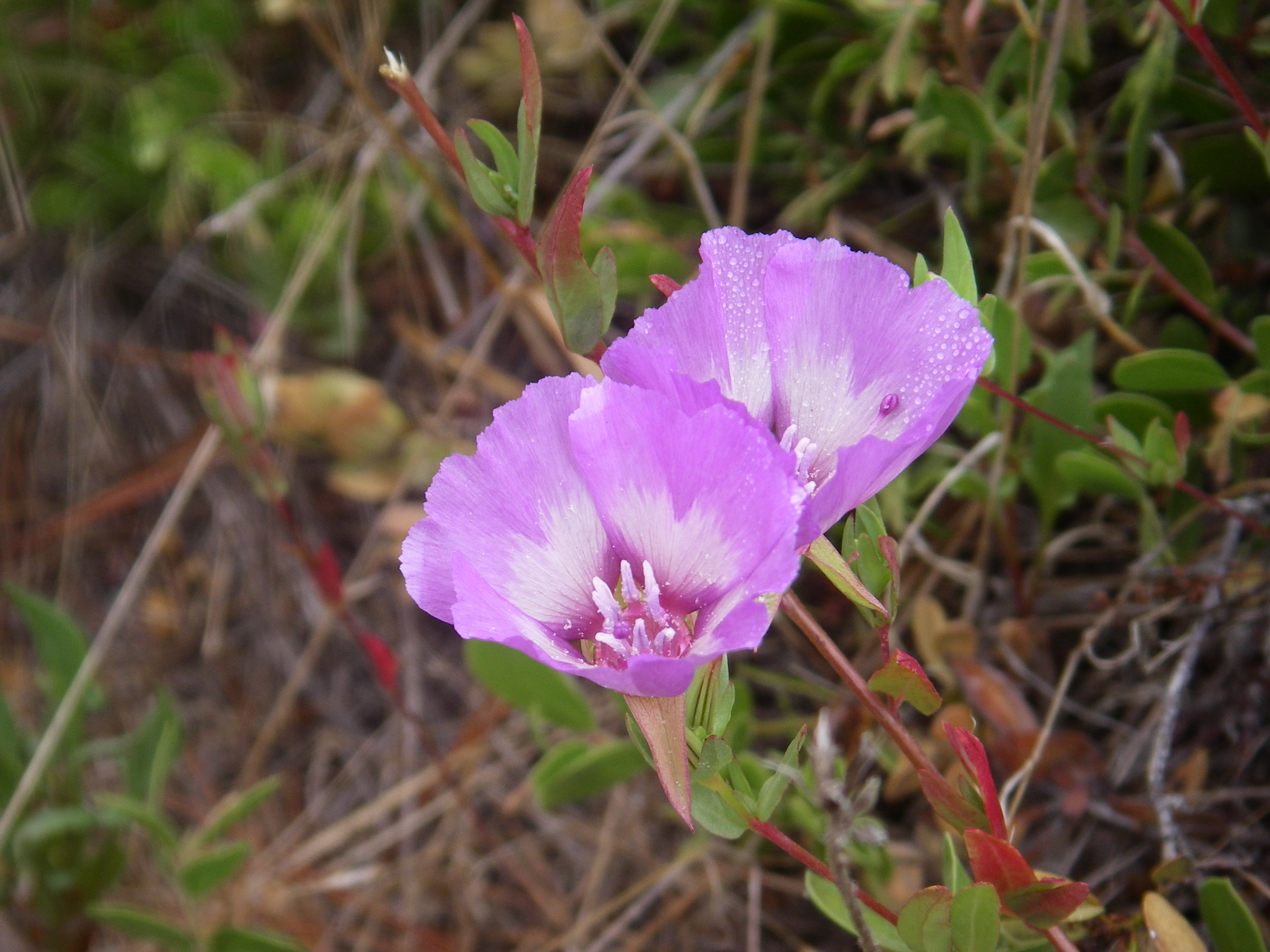

Conservation status
- Endangered (ESA)

Scientific classification
- Kingdom: Plantae
- Clade: Tracheophytes
- Clade: Angiosperms
- Clade: Eudicots
- Clade: Rosids
- Order: Myrtales
- Family: Onagraceae
- Genus: Clarkia
- Species: C. imbricata

Binomial name
- Clarkia imbricata F.H.Lewis & M.E.Lewis

= Clarkia imbricata =

Species of flowering plant

Clarkia imbricata is a rare species of flowering plant in the evening primrose family known by the common name Vine Hill clarkia. It is endemic to Sonoma County, California, where it is known from only one remaining natural occurrence near Vine Hill. A second natural population located on private land was extirpated when the owners plowed up the soil crust. The California Native Plant Society has established a third population from cuttings and is tending it in a reserve. This is a federally listed endangered species.

Vine Hill clarkia is an annual herb growing erect to about half a meter in maximum height. The leaves are lance-shaped and about 2 centimeters long. The inflorescence is a dense array of open flowers and erect closed flower buds. The four sepals separate when the flower opens. The petals are fan-shaped with frilly edges, measuring 2 to 2.5 centimeters long. They are lavender with a wash of white near the base and a wedge of darker lavender above. There are 8 stamens with anthers of equal size, and a protruding stigma.

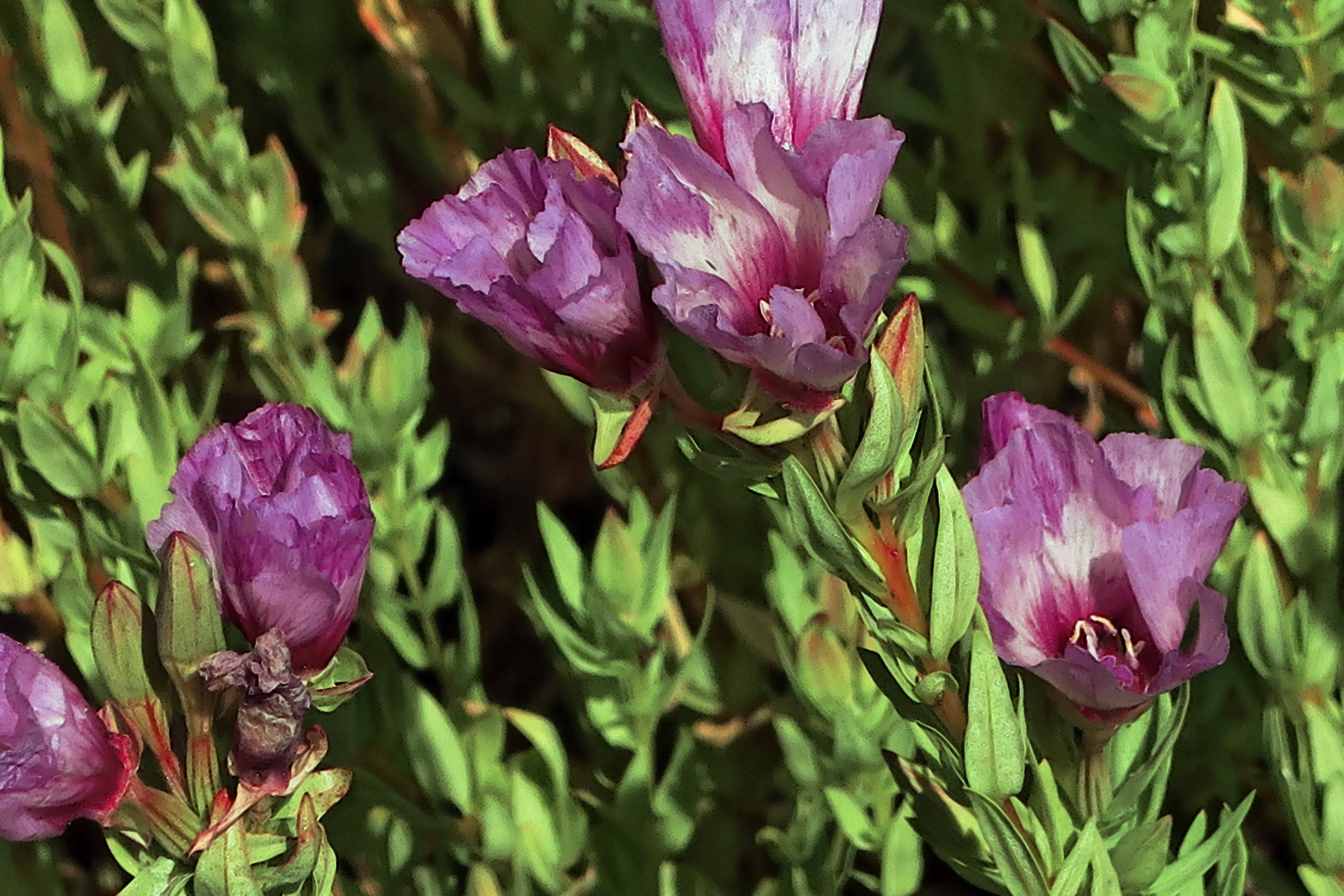
Clarkia imbricata at Regional Parks Botanic Garden
