= Clarkia prostrata =

Conservation status
- Vulnerable (NatureServe)

Scientific classification
- Kingdom: Plantae
- Clade: Tracheophytes
- Clade: Angiosperms
- Clade: Eudicots
- Clade: Rosids
- Order: Myrtales
- Family: Onagraceae
- Genus: Clarkia
- Species: C. prostrata

Binomial name
- Clarkia prostrata F.H.Lewis & M.E.Lewis

Species of flowering plant

Clarkia prostrata is a species of flowering plant in the evening primrose family known by the common name prostrate clarkia. It is endemic to the coastline of San Luis Obispo County, California, where it grows on seaside bluffs in forested and grassy areas. This annual herb is prostrate as opposed to erect as most other Clarkia species are. Its stems extend to a maximum length approaching half a meter and are usually somewhat fuzzy in texture. The leaves are oval in shape, up to 2.5 centimeters long, and lack petioles. The sepals of the flower separate into two pairs, revealing the lavender-pink blooming petals. Each petal is just over a centimeter long, fan-shaped to oval, and sometimes with a yellow base marked with a red spot.
