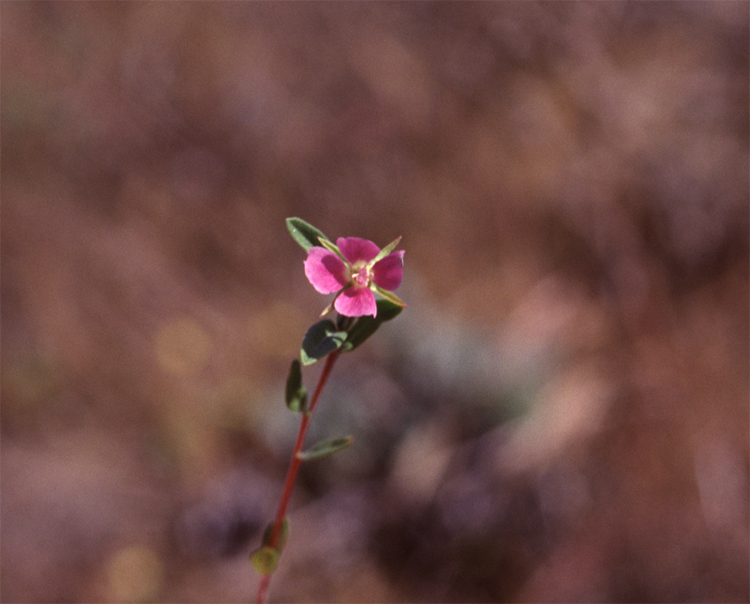

Conservation status
- Vulnerable (NatureServe)

Scientific classification
- Kingdom: Plantae
- Clade: Tracheophytes
- Clade: Angiosperms
- Clade: Eudicots
- Clade: Rosids
- Order: Myrtales
- Family: Onagraceae
- Genus: Clarkia
- Species: C. davyi

Binomial name
- Clarkia davyi (Jeps.) F.H.Lewis & M.E.Lewis

= Clarkia davyi =

Species of flowering plant

Clarkia davyi is a species of flowering plant in the evening primrose family known by the common name Davy's fairy fan, or Davy's clarkia. It is endemic to California, where it grows in coastal habitats such as beaches and bluffs. This is an annual herb producing a thin stem which grows along the ground or somewhat upright. It is lined with small oval-shaped leaves one or two centimeters long. While in bud the flower is enclosed in four fused thick sepals. It blooms into a petite bowl-shaped corolla of four pink petals which often have lighter bases. Each petal is 5 to 11 millimeters long.
