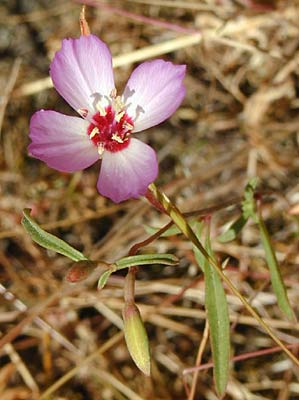

Conservation status
- Endangered (ESA)

Scientific classification
- Kingdom: Plantae
- Clade: Tracheophytes
- Clade: Angiosperms
- Clade: Eudicots
- Clade: Rosids
- Order: Myrtales
- Family: Onagraceae
- Genus: Clarkia
- Species: C. franciscana

Binomial name
- Clarkia franciscana F.H.Lewis & P.H.Raven

= Clarkia franciscana =

Species of flowering plant

Clarkia franciscana is a rare species of flowering plant in the evening primrose family known by the common name Presidio clarkia. It is endemic to the San Francisco Bay Area of California, where it is known only from two populations at the Presidio of San Francisco and three occurrences in Oakland. The plant is known only from serpentine soils.

== Distribution ==
Clarkia franciscana is a federally listed endangered species. The two San Francisco populations are on land which is protected from development but is affected by many other factors including invasive plant species, trampling, and landscaping of vegetation. The three Oakland populations are probably the remnants of one population that was fragmented by development in the heavily altered urban habitat. The largest of the three occurrences is partially protected at Redwood Regional Park, but the other two are on privately owned property which is proposed to undergo some development. Construction of housing is proposed on the site, with less than an acre being left undeveloped as a compromise between developers and environmental advocates.

== Description ==
The Presidio clarkia, Clarkia franciscana, is an erect annual herb growing up to about 40 centimeters in maximum height. The leaves are narrowly lance-shaped and up to about 3.5 centimeters long. The top of the stem is occupied by the inflorescence, which bears opening flowers and closed, erect flower buds. The sepals stay fused together as the petals bloom from one side. The small corolla is bowl-shaped, with petals up to 1.3 centimeters long and wedge-shaped with mostly flat tips. The petals are lavender-pink in color, darkest at the tips and lightening to nearly white at the base, where there is a deep red spot. The plant is self-pollinating. The population sizes are variable from year to year; sometimes there are no plants seen at all, the seed banks remaining dormant until conditions improve.
