= Quantum evolution =

Evolution where transitional forms are particularly unstable and do not last long

Quantum evolution is a component of George Gaylord Simpson's multi-tempoed theory of evolution proposed to explain the rapid emergence of higher taxonomic groups in the fossil record. According to Simpson, evolutionary rates differ from group to group and even among closely related lineages. These different rates of evolutionary change were designated by Simpson as bradytelic (slow tempo), horotelic (medium tempo), and tachytelic (rapid tempo).

Quantum evolution differed from these styles of change in that it involved a drastic shift in the adaptive zones of certain classes of animals. The word "quantum" therefore refers to an "all-or-none reaction", where transitional forms are particularly unstable, and thereby perish rapidly and completely. Although quantum evolution may happen at any taxonomic level, it plays a much larger role in "the origin taxonomic units of relatively high rank, such as families, orders, and classes."

== Quantum evolution in plants ==
Usage of the phrase "quantum evolution" in plants was apparently first articulated by Verne Grant in 1963 (pp. 458-459). He cited an earlier 1958 paper by Harlan Lewis and Peter H. Raven, wherein Grant asserted that Lewis and Raven gave a "parallel" definition of quantum evolution as defined by Simpson. Lewis and Raven postulated that species in the Genus Clarkia had a mode of speciation that resulted

...as a consequence of a rapid reorganization of the chromosomes due to the presence, at some time, of a genotype conducive to extensive chromosome breakage. A similar mode of origin by rapid reorganization of the chromosomes is suggested for the derivation of other species of Clarkia. In all of these examples the derivative populations grow adjacent to the parental species, which they resemble closely in morphology, but from which they are reproductively isolated because of multiple structural differences in their chromosomes. The spatial relationship of each parental species and its derivative suggests that differentiation has been recent. The repeated occurrence of the same pattern of differentiation in Clarkia suggests that a rapid reorganization of chromosomes has been an important mode of evolution in the genus. This rapid reorganization of the chromosomes is comparable to the systemic mutations proposed by Goldschmidt as a mechanism of macroevolution. In Clarkia, we have not observed marked changes in physiology and pattern of development that could be described as macroevolution. Reorganization of the genomes may, however, set the stage for subsequent evolution along a very different course from that of the ancestral populations

Harlan Lewis refined this concept in a 1962 paper where he coined the term "Catastrophic Speciation" to describe this mode of speciation, since he theorized that the reductions in population size and consequent inbreeding that led to chromosomal rearrangements occurred in small populations that were subject to severe drought.

Leslie D. Gottlieb in his 2003 summary of the subject in plants stated

we can define quantum speciation as the budding off of a new and very different daughter species from a semi-isolated peripheral population of the ancestral species in a cross-fertilizing organism...as compared with geographical speciation, which is a gradual and conservative process, quantum speciation is rapid and radical in its phenotypic or genotypic effects or both.

Gottlieb did not believe that sympatric speciation required disruptive selection to form a reproductive isolating barrier, as defined by Grant, and in fact Gottlieb stated that requiring disruptive selection was "unnecessarily restrictive" in identifying cases of sympatric speciation. In this 2003 paper Gottlieb summarized instances of quantum evolution in the plant species Clarkia, Layia, and Stephanomeria.

== Mechanisms ==
According to Simpson (1944), quantum evolution resulted from Sewall Wright's model of random genetic drift. Simpson believed that major evolutionary transitions would arise when small populations, that were isolated and limited from gene flow, would fixate upon unusual gene combinations. This "inadaptive phase" (caused by genetic drift) would then (by natural selection) drive a deme population from one stable adaptive peak to another on the adaptive fitness landscape. However, in his Major Features of Evolution (1953) Simpson wrote that this mechanism was still controversial:

"whether prospective adaptation as prelude to quantum evolution arises adaptively or inadaptively. It was concluded above that it usually arises adaptively… The precise role of, say, genetic drift in this process thus is largely speculative at present. It may have an essential part or none. It surely is not involved in all cases of quantum evolution, but there is a strong possibility that it is often involved. If or when it is involved, it is an initiating mechanism. Drift can only rarely, and only for lower categories, have completed the transition to a new adaptive zone."

This preference for adaptive over inadaptive forces led Stephen Jay Gould to call attention to the "hardening of the Modern Synthesis", a trend in the 1950s where adaptationism took precedence over the pluralism of mechanisms common in the 1930s and 40s.

Simpson considered quantum evolution his crowning achievement, being "perhaps the most important outcome of [my] investigation, but also the most controversial and hypothetical."

== See also ==
- Environmental niche modelling
- Mutationism
- Punctuated equilibrium
- Quantum speciation
- Rapid modes of evolution
- Shifting balance theory
- Sympatric speciation

== Sources ==
- Eldredge, Niles (1995). Reinventing Darwin. New York: John Wiley & Sons. pp. 20-26.
- Gould, S. J. (1994). "Tempo and mode in the macroevolutionary reconstruction on Darwinism" PNAS USA 91(15): 6764-71.
- Gould S.J. (2002). The Structure of Evolutionary Theory Cambridge MA: Harvard Univ. Press. pp. 529-31.
- Mayr, Ernst (1976). Evolution and the Diversity of Life. Cambridge MA: Belknap Press. p. 206.
- Mayr, Ernst (1982). The Growth of Biological Thought. Cambridge MA: Belknap Press. pp. 555, 609-10.
