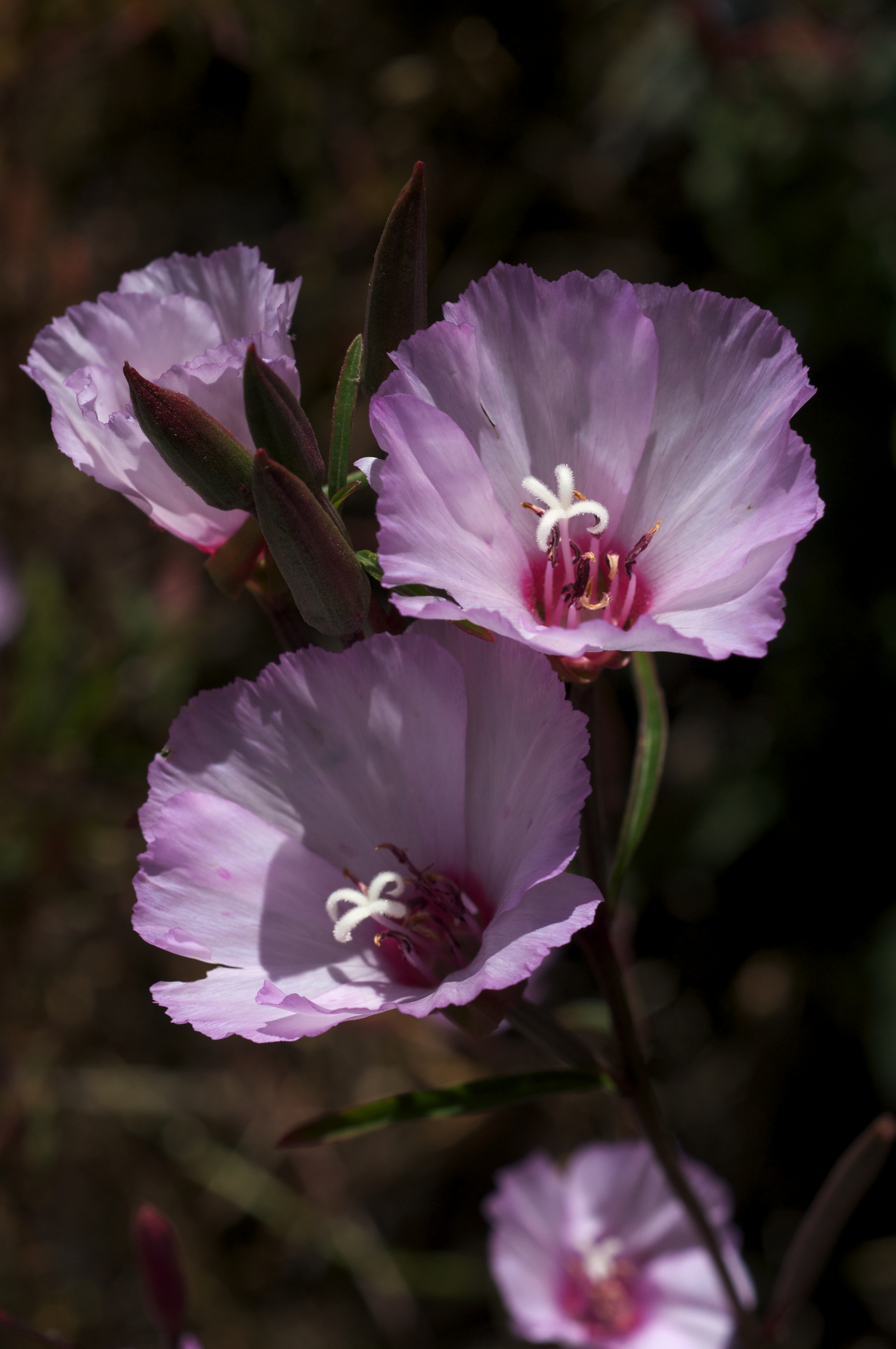

Scientific classification
- Kingdom: Plantae
- Clade: Tracheophytes
- Clade: Angiosperms
- Clade: Eudicots
- Clade: Rosids
- Order: Myrtales
- Family: Onagraceae
- Genus: Clarkia
- Species: C. rubicunda

Binomial name
- Clarkia rubicunda (Lindl.) F.H. Lewis & M.R. Lewis

= Clarkia rubicunda =

Species of flowering plant

Clarkia rubicunda is a flowering plant endemic to California. It is found mostly on the Central Coast part of the state. The plant is known by the common names Ruby Chalice Clarkia and Farewell to Spring.

Clarkia rubicunda bears attractive poppy-like blooms with wide, cup-shaped corollas of four pink or purplish petals. The corolla of the flower sometimes has a bright red center. As the common name suggests, it blooms in June and July.

It is similar in appearance to another flower of genus Clarkia, the Clarkia amoena, also called "Farewell to Spring".
