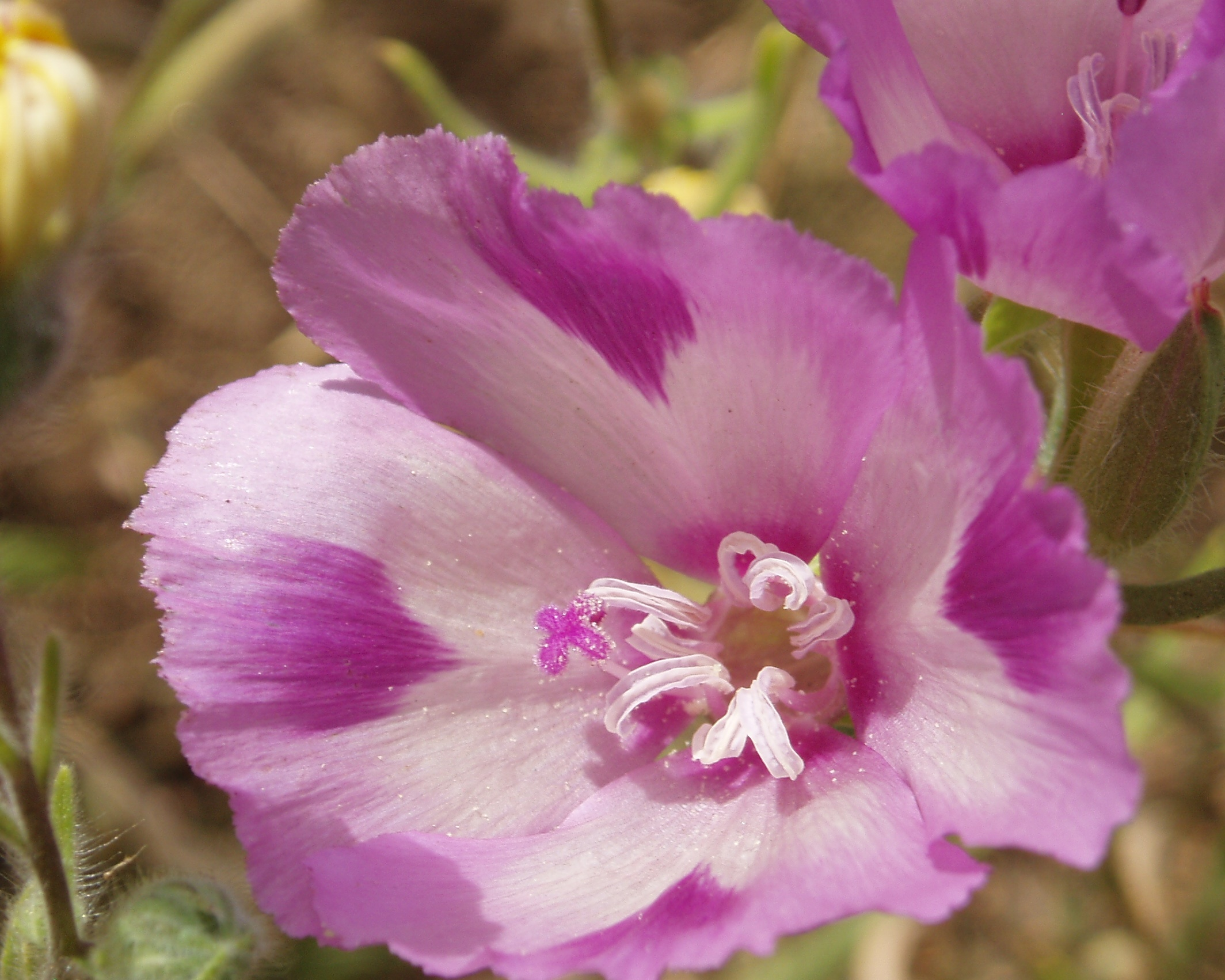

Conservation status
- Vulnerable (NatureServe)

Scientific classification
- Kingdom: Plantae
- Clade: Tracheophytes
- Clade: Angiosperms
- Clade: Eudicots
- Clade: Rosids
- Order: Myrtales
- Family: Onagraceae
- Genus: Clarkia
- Species: C. williamsonii

Binomial name
- Clarkia williamsonii (Durand & Hilg.) F.H.Lewis & M.E.Lewis

= Clarkia williamsonii =

Species of flowering plant

Clarkia williamsonii is a species of flowering plant endemic to California, where it is known from the forests and woodlands of the northern and central Sierra Nevada foothills.

== Description ==
Clarkia williamsonii is an erect annual herb with linear to lance-shaped leaves each a few centimeters long.

The inflorescence produces opening flowers and buds which are closed except for the tips, where the sepals do not fuse. The sepals all separate or remain fused in pairs as the flower blooms. Each fan-shaped petal is up to 3 centimeters long and is usually lavender with a white area and a purple spot in the middle. The petals are occasionally solid deep red.

A unique feature of this species is its tendency to have widespread reciprocal translocations. Wedberg et al. showed that populations of this plant in the foothills of California had frequencies of translocation heterozygosity approaching 50%, while those in higher elevations in alpine regions have frequencies of less than 10%.
