= Margaret Ensign Lewis =

American botanist

- Born: 1919
- Died: November 2017 (aged 97–98)
- Education: Pomona College (undergraduate), University of California, Berkeley (master's)
- Spouse: Harlan Lewis
- Scientific career
- Workplaces: Amherst College, University of California at Los Angeles Herbarium

Margaret Ruth Ensign Lewis (1919 – November 2017) was an American botanist, taxonomist, and professor specializing in California flora.

The International Plant Names Index lists 38 plant names published by Margaret Ruth Ensign.

== Publications ==
- Ensign, Margaret (March 1942). "A Revision of the Celastraceous Genus Forsellesia (Glossopetalon)". American Midland Naturalist. 27 (2): 501. doi:10.2307/2421016.
- Lewis, Harlan; Lewis, Margaret (1953). "New Species and Changes in Nomenclature in the Genus Clarkia (Onagraceae)". Madroño. 12 (2): 33–39.
- Lewis, Harlan; Lewis, Margaret Ensign (1955). "The Genus Clarkia". Univ. Calif. Pub. Bot. 20 (4): 241–392.
- Roberts, Margaret R.; Lewis, Harlan (1955). "Subspeciation in Clarkia biloba". Evolution. 9 (4): 445–454. doi:10.1111/j.1558-5646.1955.tb01554.x.
- Lewis, Harlan; Roberts, Margaret R. (1956). "The Origin of Clarkia lingulata". Evolution. 10 (2): 126–138. doi:10.2307/2405888.

The standard author abbreviations Ensign and M.E.Lewis are used to indicate this person as the author when citing a botanical name.
