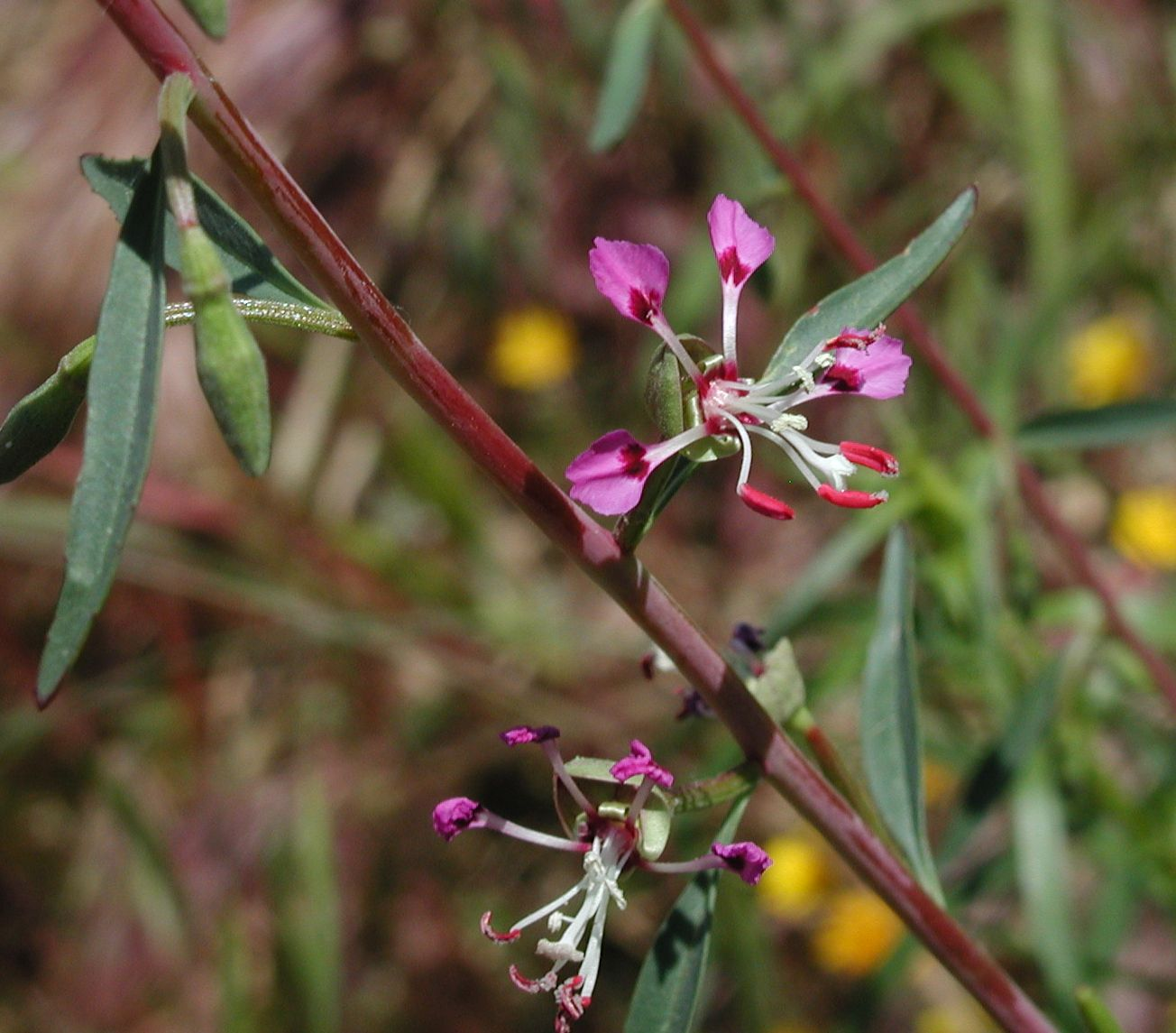

Scientific classification
- Kingdom: Plantae
- Clade: Tracheophytes
- Clade: Angiosperms
- Clade: Eudicots
- Clade: Rosids
- Order: Myrtales
- Family: Onagraceae
- Genus: Clarkia
- Species: C. exilis

Binomial name
- Clarkia exilis F.H.Lewis & Vasek

= Clarkia exilis =

Kern River clarkia

Species of flowering plant

Clarkia exilis is a small herbaceous annual plant of western North America. It is an uncommon species in the evening primrose family known by the common names Kern River clarkia and slender clarkia.

== Description ==
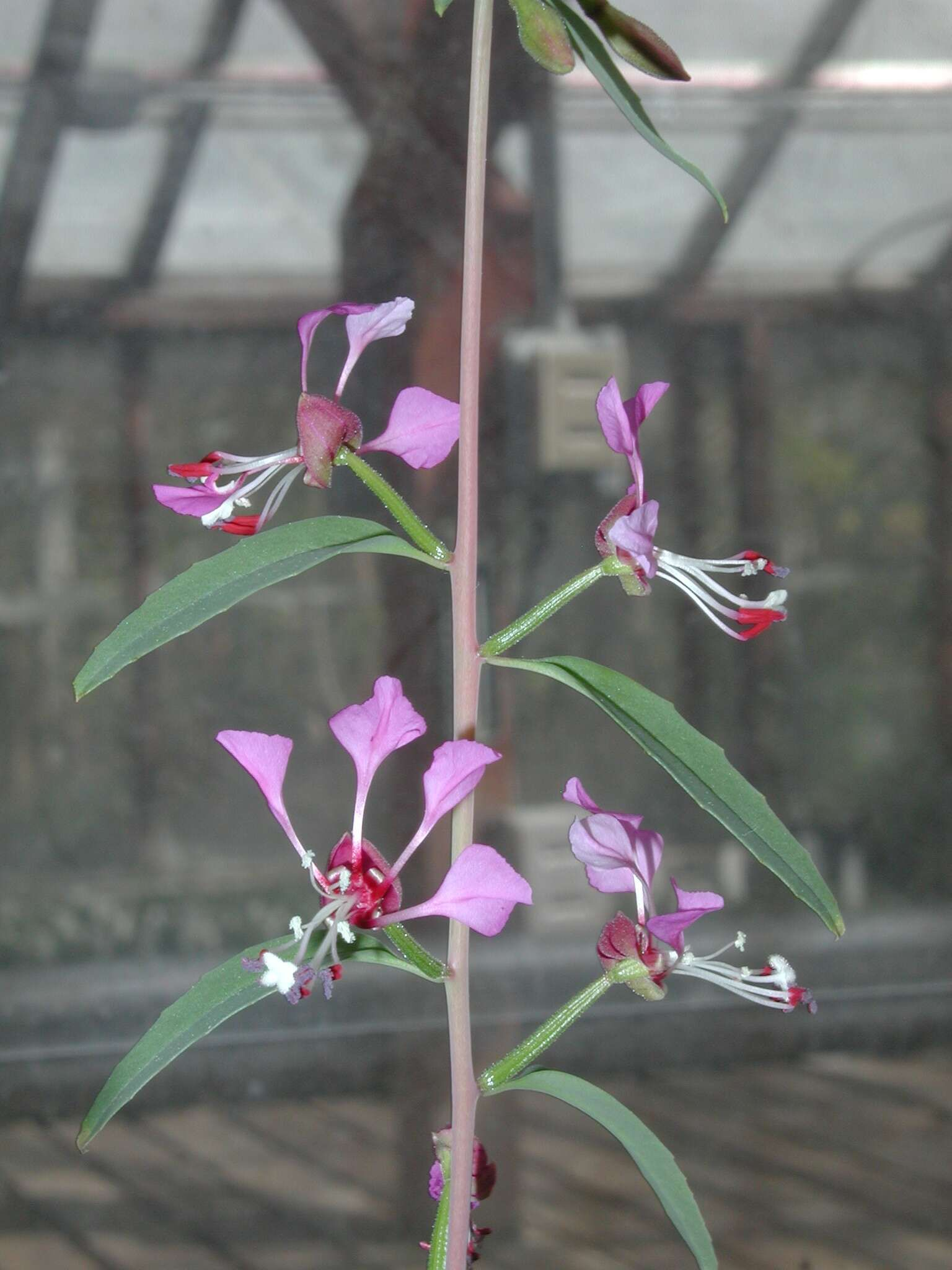
Flowers with open anthers and receptive stigmas

Clarkia exilis is an annual herb producing a slender, erect stem often exceeding half a meter in height. The bright green leaves are lance-shaped to narrowly oval, hairless, up to 6 centimeters long, and sometimes lacking petioles. The top of the stem is occupied by the inflorescence, with open flowers and deflexed buds towards the tip of the stem. The sepals and ovary may be lightly hairy (but typically distinctly less so than its sister-species Clarkia unguiculata). The sepals will remain fused together along one side as the petals bloom. Each of the four petals has a narrow claw and diamond-shaped limb. The entire petal is up to 1.5 centimeters long and white or soft purple or pink, sometimes with a purple spot. There are eight stamens, four of which have large reddish anthers and four with smaller, paler anthers. At maturity the style is equal to the stamens. The fruit is a capsule up to 3 centimeters long and about 2 millimeters wide that may contain from a few to 80 seeds.

== Distribution ==
Clarkia exilis is endemic to California, where it is known only from the woodlands of the southernmost Sierra Nevada foothills immediately northeast of Bakersfield and the adjacent Tehachapi Mountains. Populations are largely proximal to the Kern River and its nearby drainages, with some few populations found to the immediate west in the foothills of the Sierra as they descend to the Great Central Valley.
