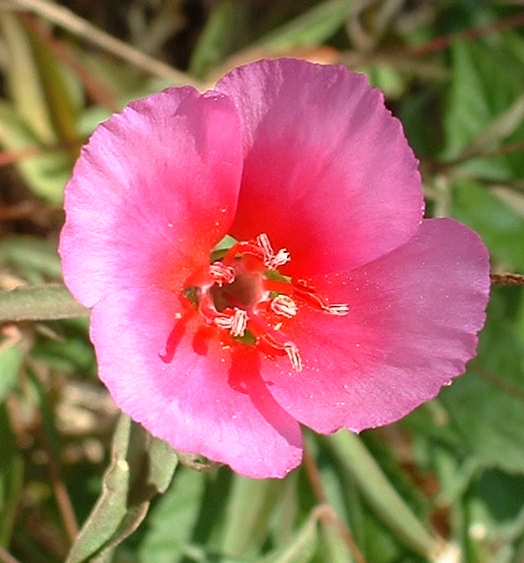

Conservation status
- Secure (NatureServe)

Scientific classification
- Kingdom: Plantae
- Clade: Tracheophytes
- Clade: Angiosperms
- Clade: Eudicots
- Clade: Rosids
- Order: Myrtales
- Family: Onagraceae
- Genus: Clarkia
- Species: C. amoena

Binomial name
- Clarkia amoena (Lehm.) A.Nelson & J.F.Macbr.

Synonyms
- Godetia amoena (Lehm.) G.Don; Godetia amoena var. typica C.L.Hitchc.; Godetia lehmanniana Spach; Oenothera amoena Lehm.; Oenothera prismatica var. amoena (Lehm.) H.Lév.

= Clarkia amoena =

Species of flowering plant

Clarkia amoena, commonly known as farewell to spring, godetia, or satin flower, is a species of flowering plant in the family Onagraceae. It is native to western North America. It is found in coastal hills and mountains from British Columbia south to the San Francisco Bay Area of California.

This annual herb produces showy pink to lavender flowers and is known for its late spring to early summer blooming period. The species was formerly classified in the genus Godetia, and is still sometimes referred to by the synonym Godetia amoena.

== Description ==
It is an annual plant growing to 1 m tall, with slender, linear leaves 2–7 cm long and 2–6 mm broad. The flowers are pink to pale purple, with four broad petals 1.5–6 cm long. The fruit is a dry capsule, which splits open when mature to release the numerous seeds.

== Taxonomy ==
Five subspecies are currently recognised, although intermediate forms are commonly found:

- Clarkia amoena subsp. amoena (Lehm.) A. Nelson & J. F. Macbr. – (farewell to spring)
- Clarkia amoena subsp. caurina (Abrams) C.L. Hitchc. – (northwestern farewell to spring)
- Clarkia amoena subsp. huntiana (Jeps.) F.H. Lewis & M.E. Lewis – (Hunt's clarkia)
- Clarkia amoena subsp. lindleyi (Dougl.) C.L. Hitchc. – (Lindley's clarkia)
- Clarkia amoena subsp. whitneyi (A. Gray) H. Lewis & M. Lewis. – (Whitney's farewell to spring)

== Cultivation ==
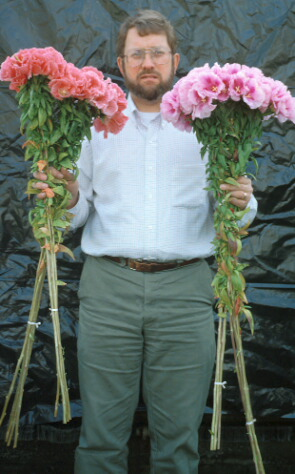
Cut stem bunches of 'Grace Salmon' and 'Grace Rose Pink' grown in a winter and spring greenhouse.

Farewell to spring is commonly cultivated as a garden plant, and cultivated varieties are known.

It is a cool season plant and will tolerate temperatures below 0 °C (32 °F) in gardens or greenhouses. It flowers faster under long day conditions. The plants grow best with minimal fertilizer. Popular cultivars introduced in the 1980s include cut flower (tall; 'Grace') and potted plant (short; 'Satin') types.

A gallery of cultivars is presented below.

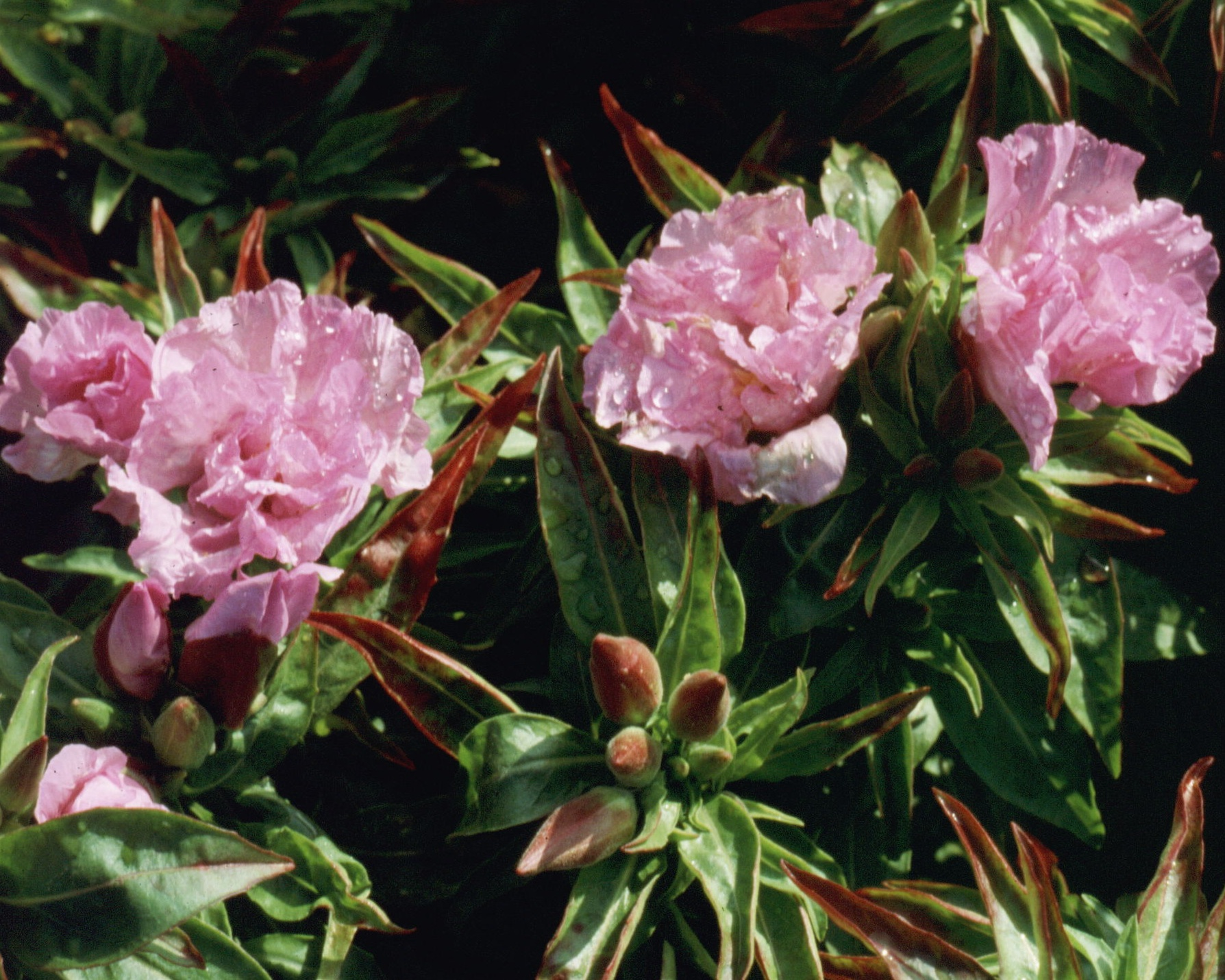
'Cattleya'

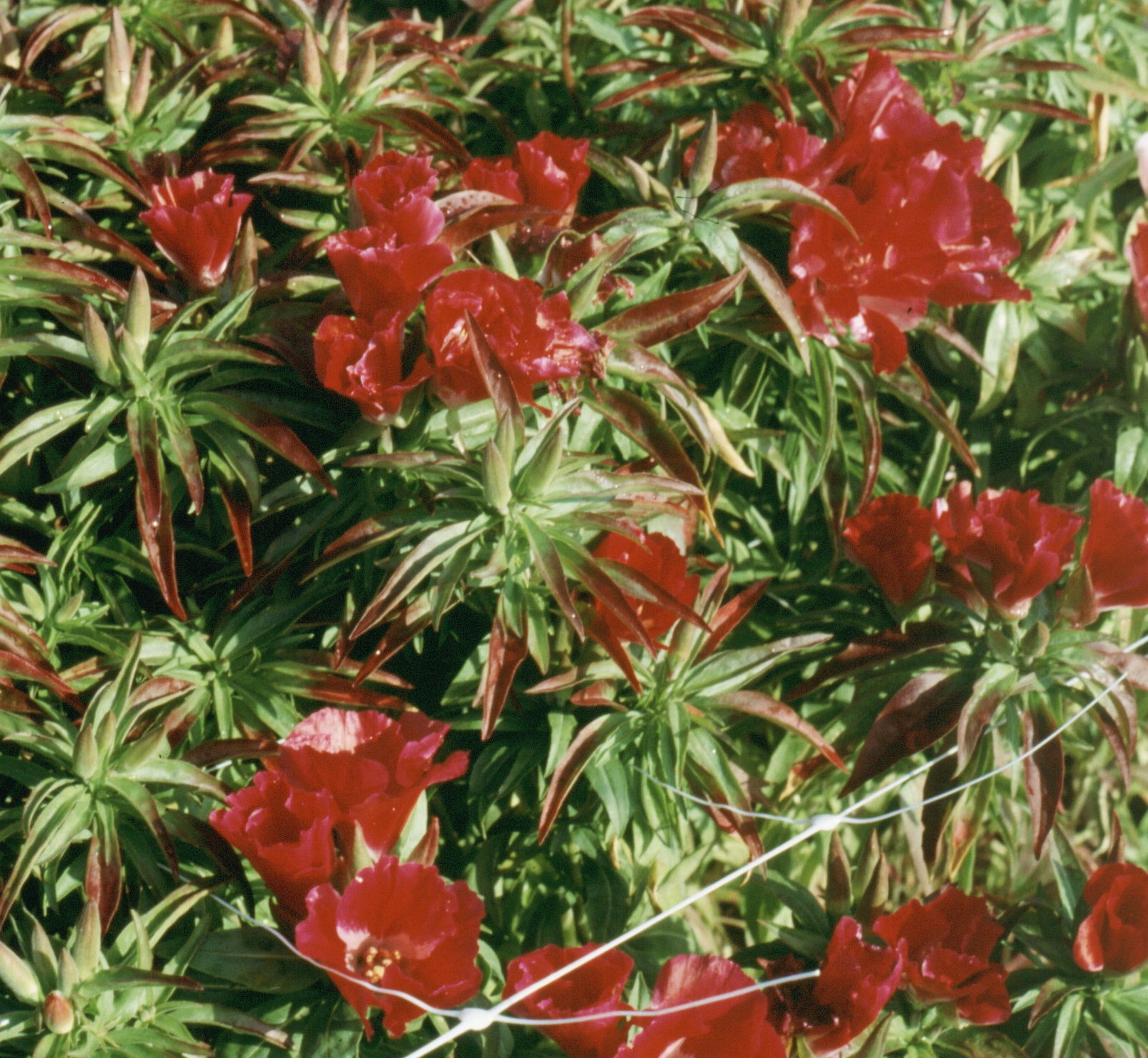
'Duke of York'

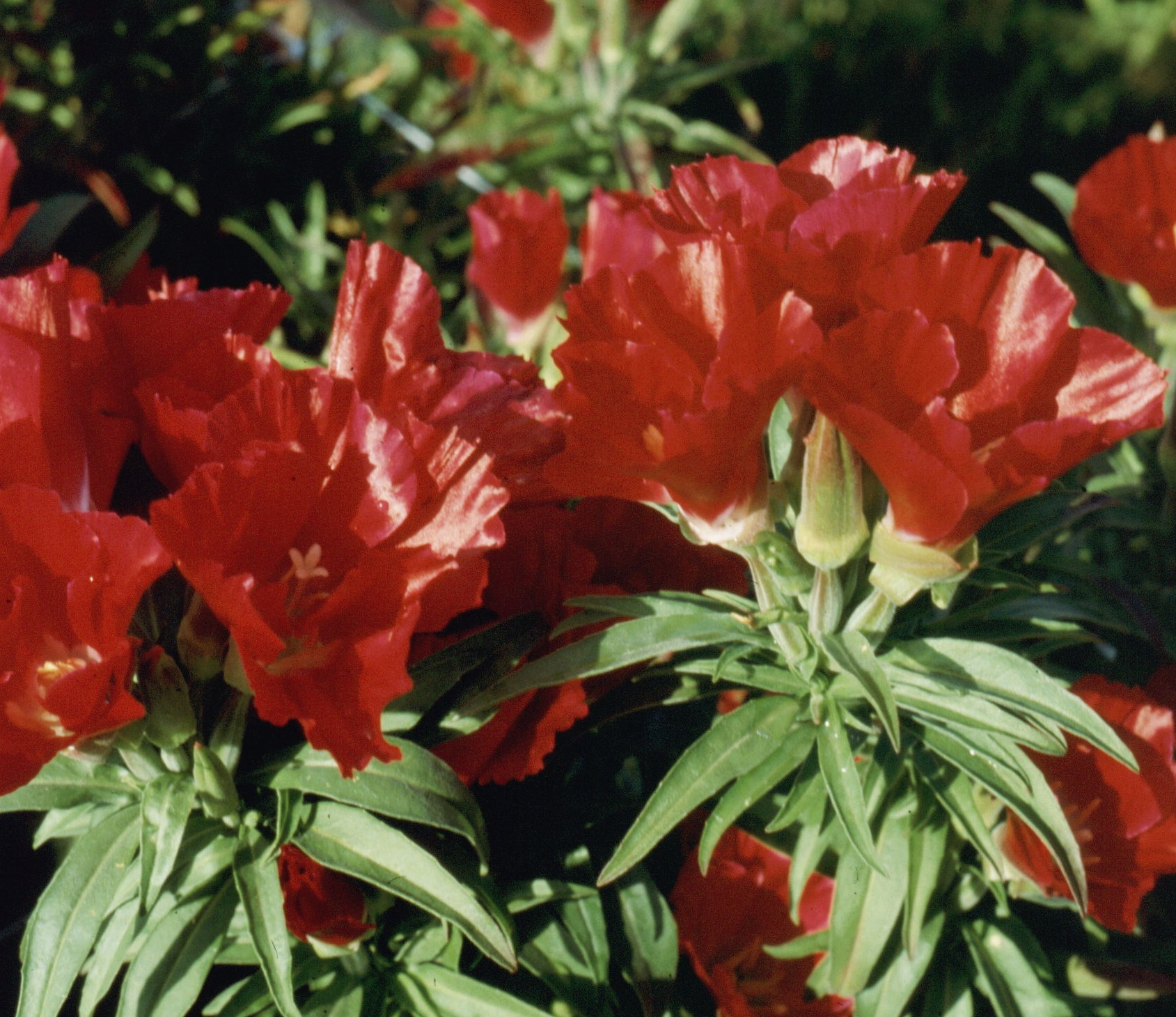
'Furora'

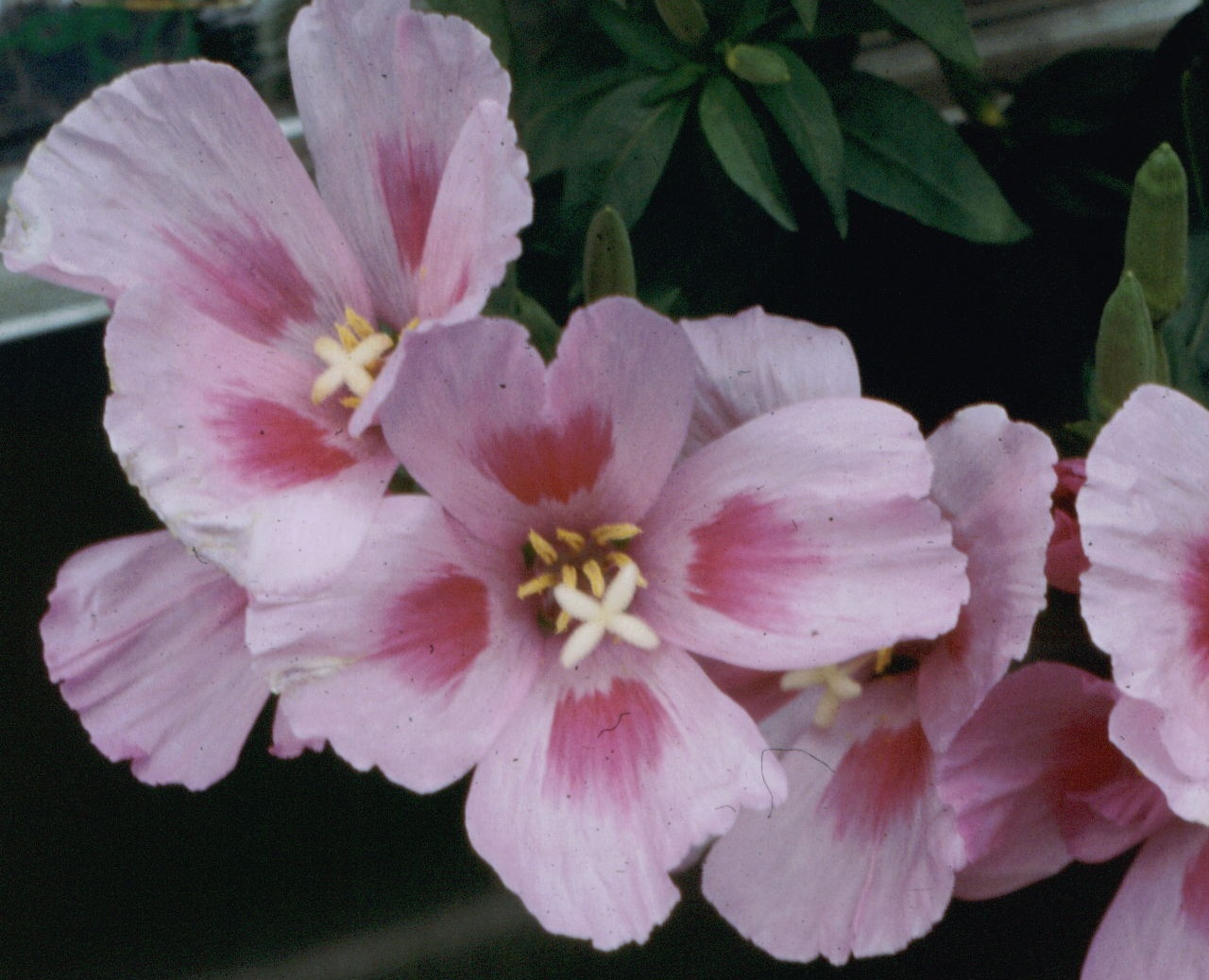
'Grace Lavender with Eye'

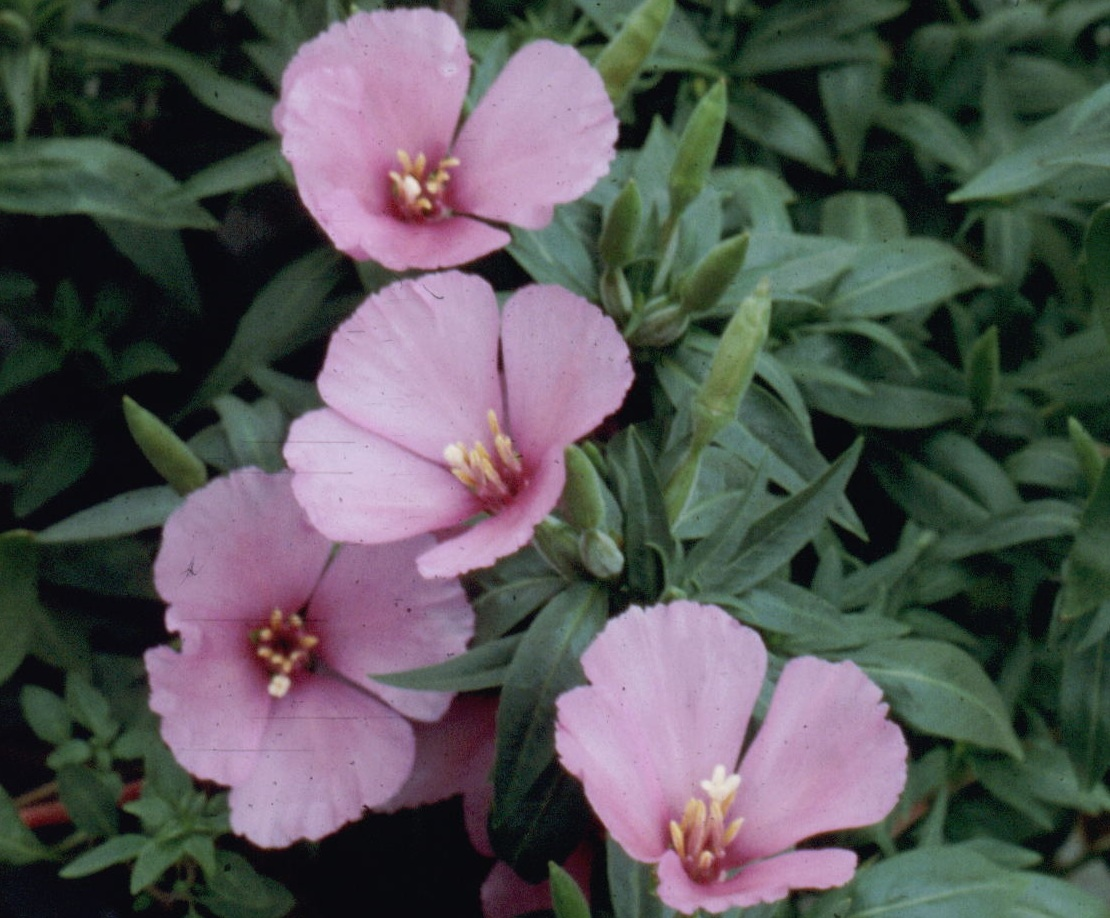
'Grace Lavender'

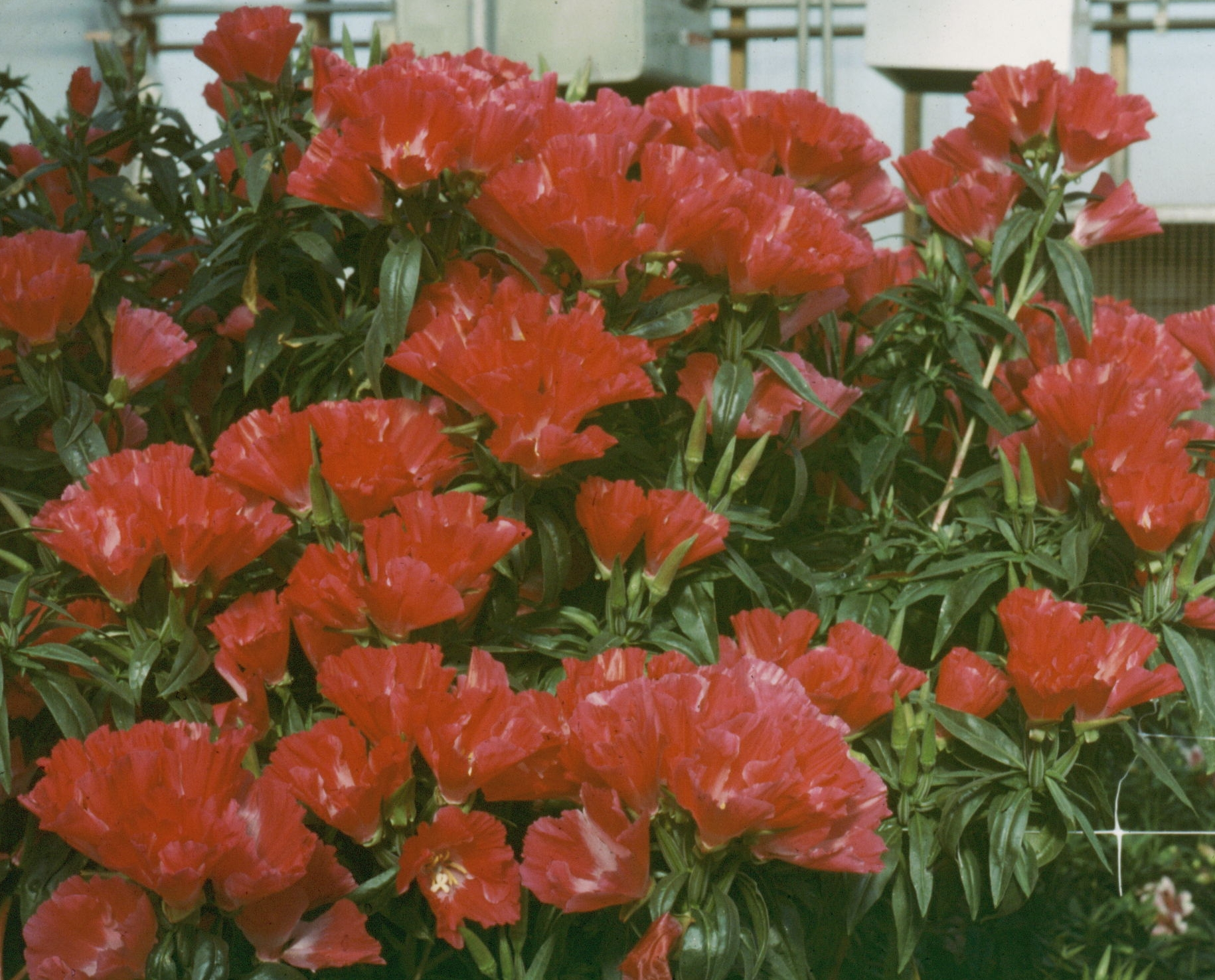
'Grace Red'

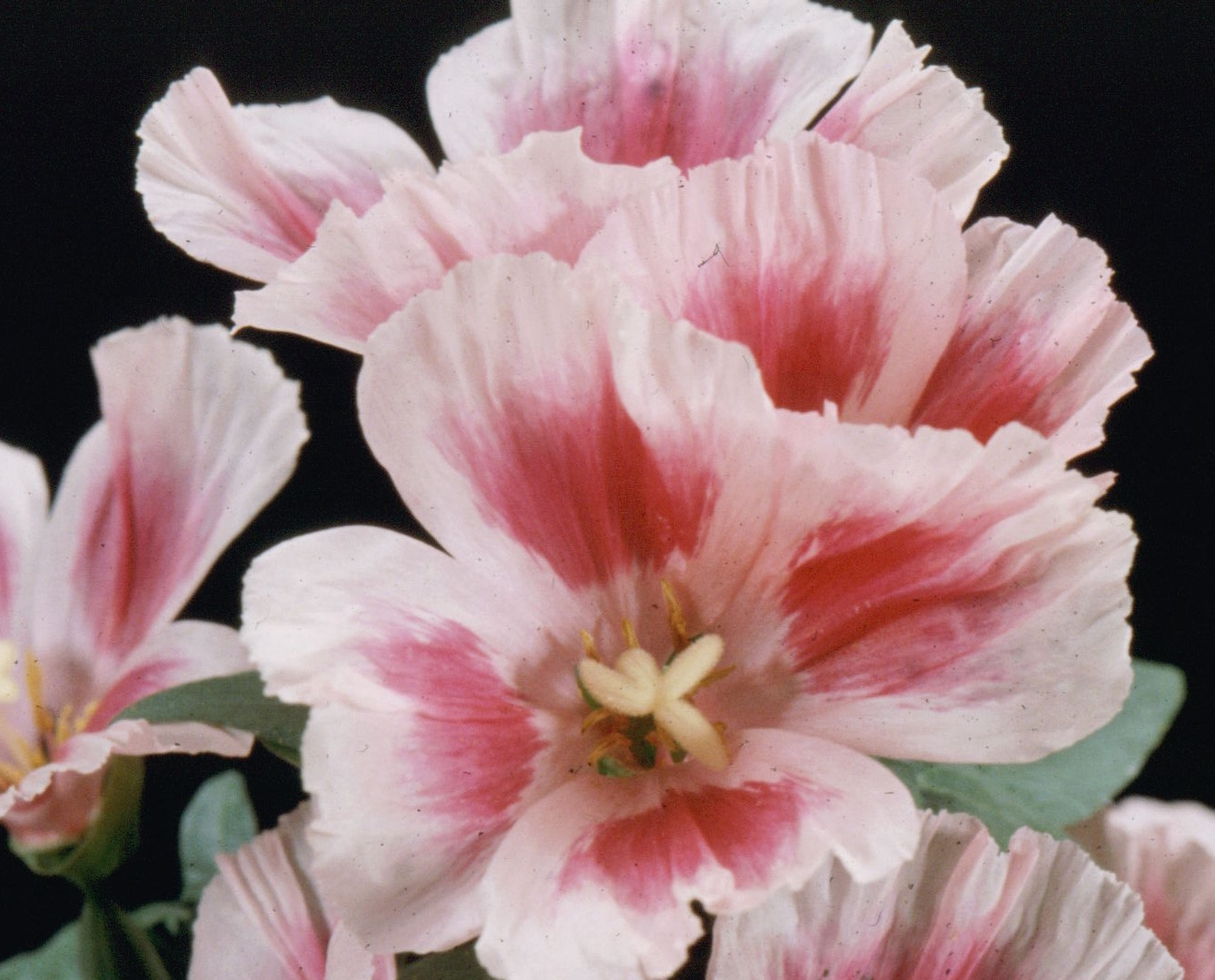
'Grace Rose Pink'

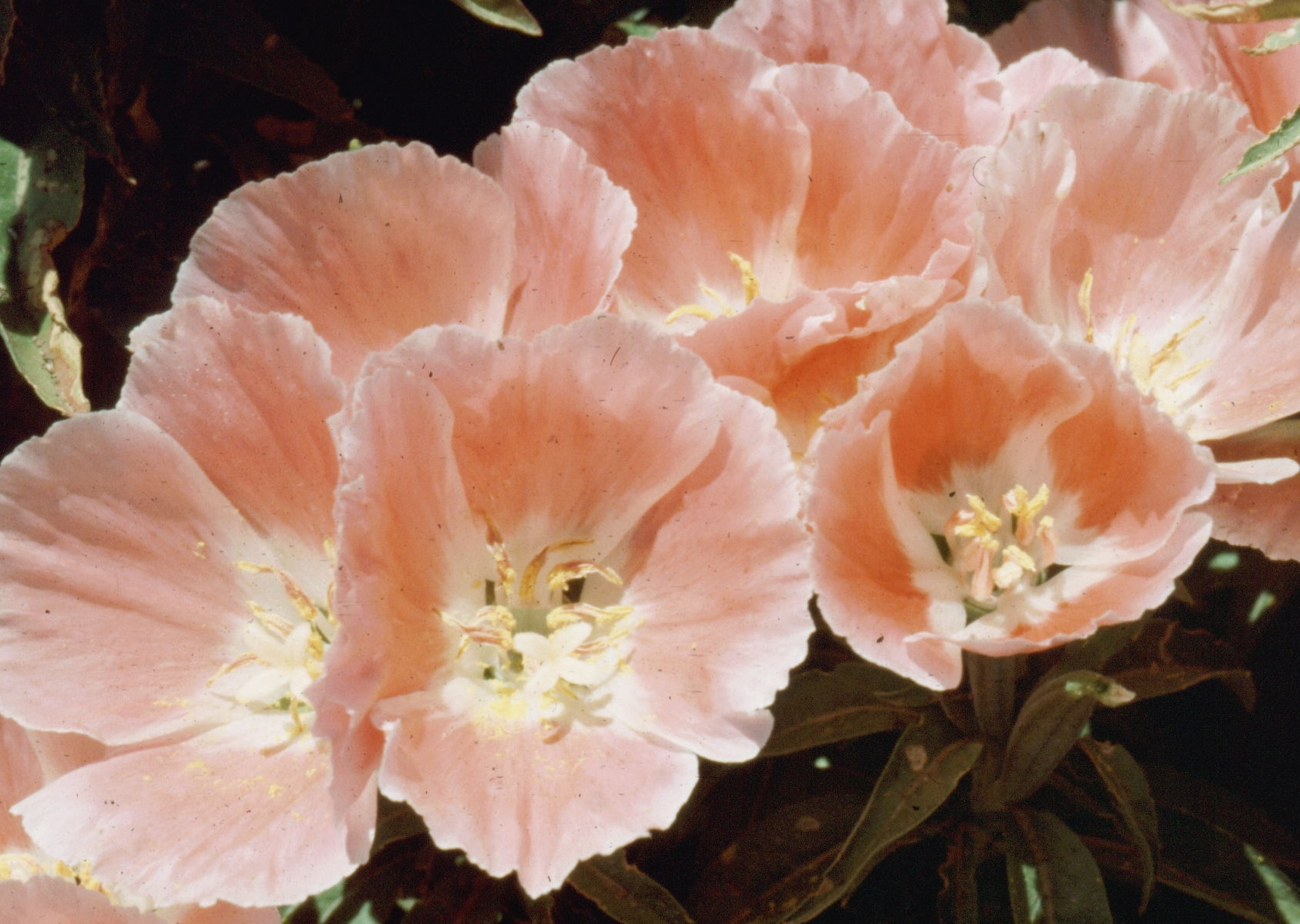
'Grace Salmon'

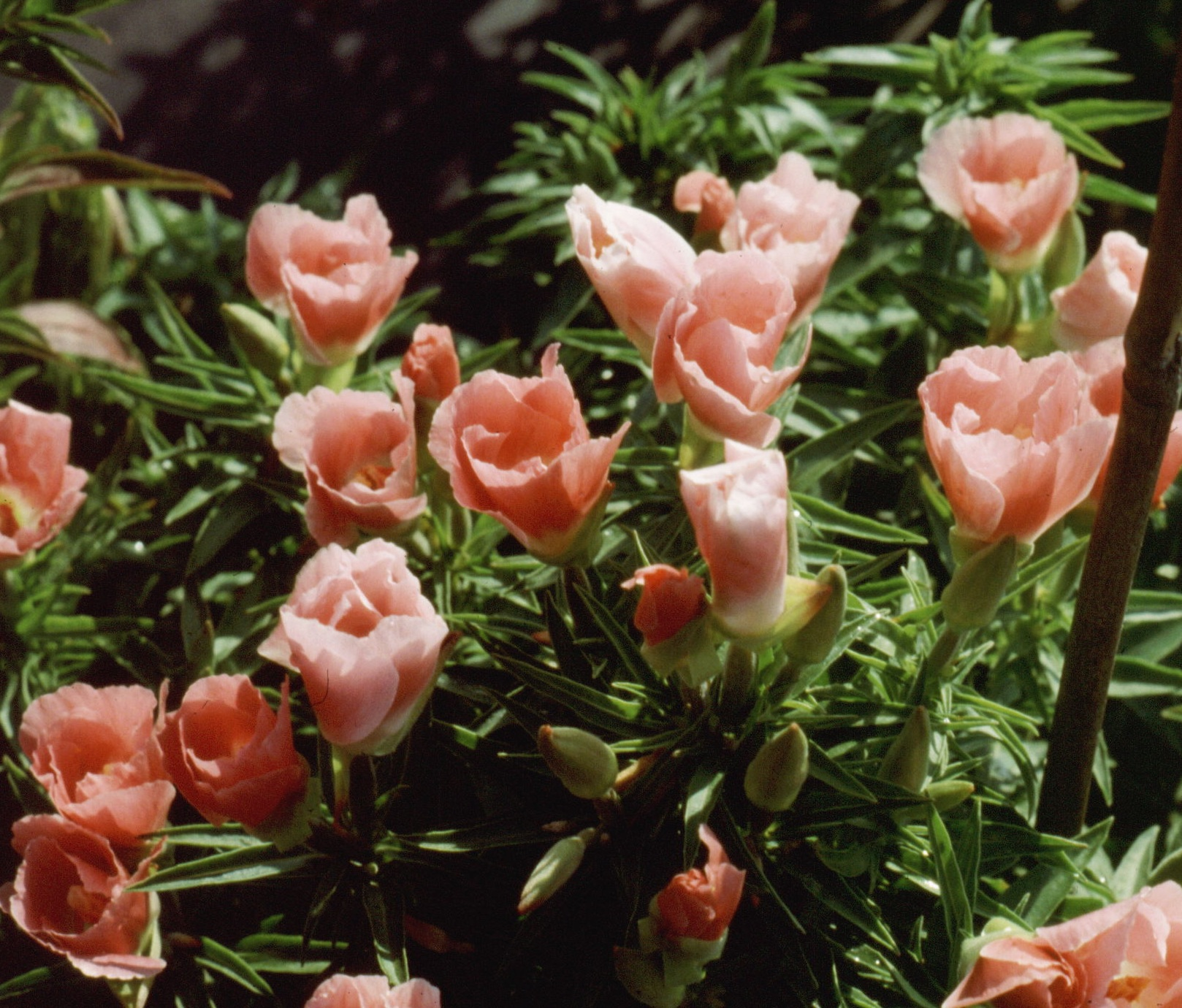
'Kelviden Glory'

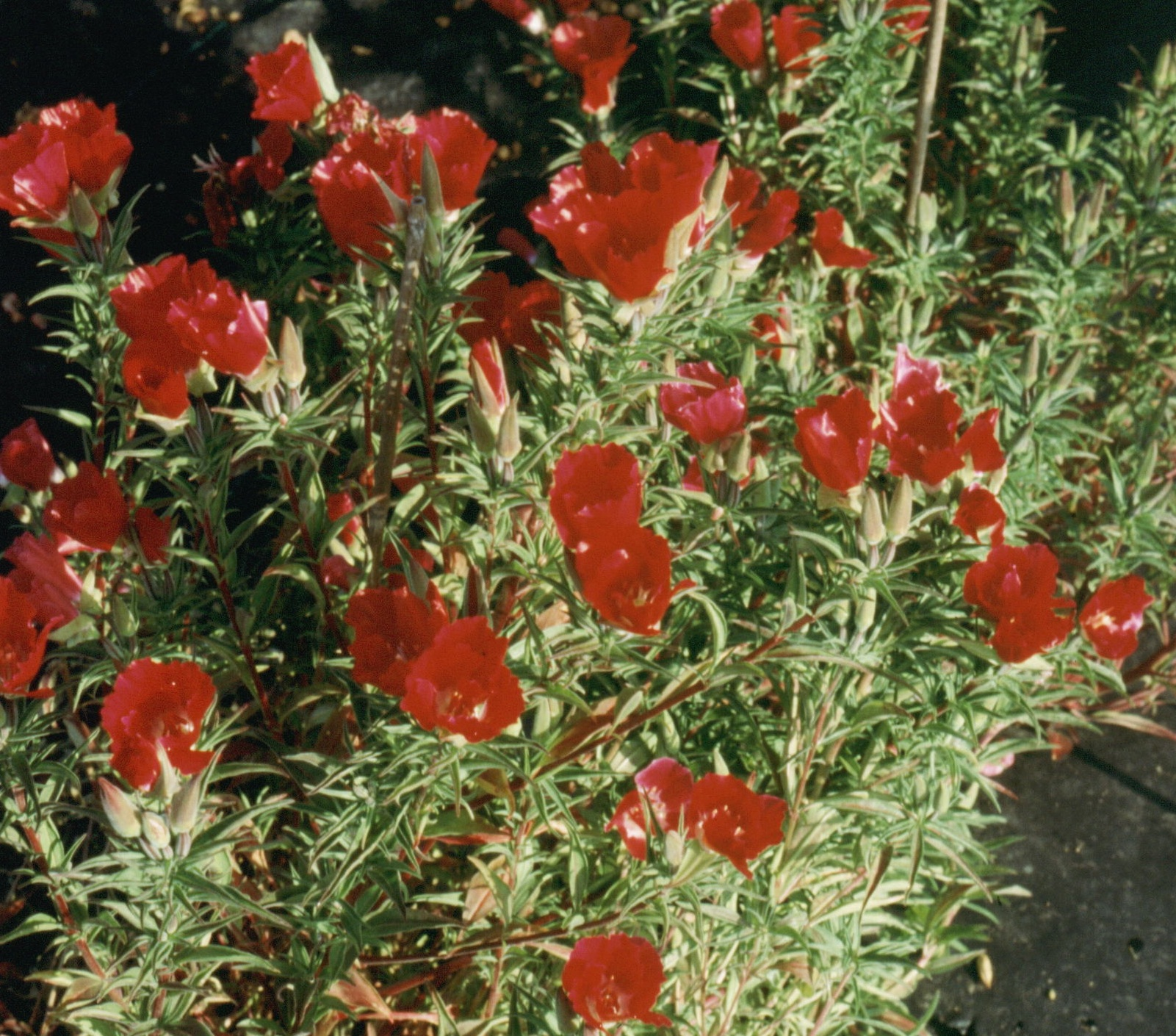
'Kyohuhai'

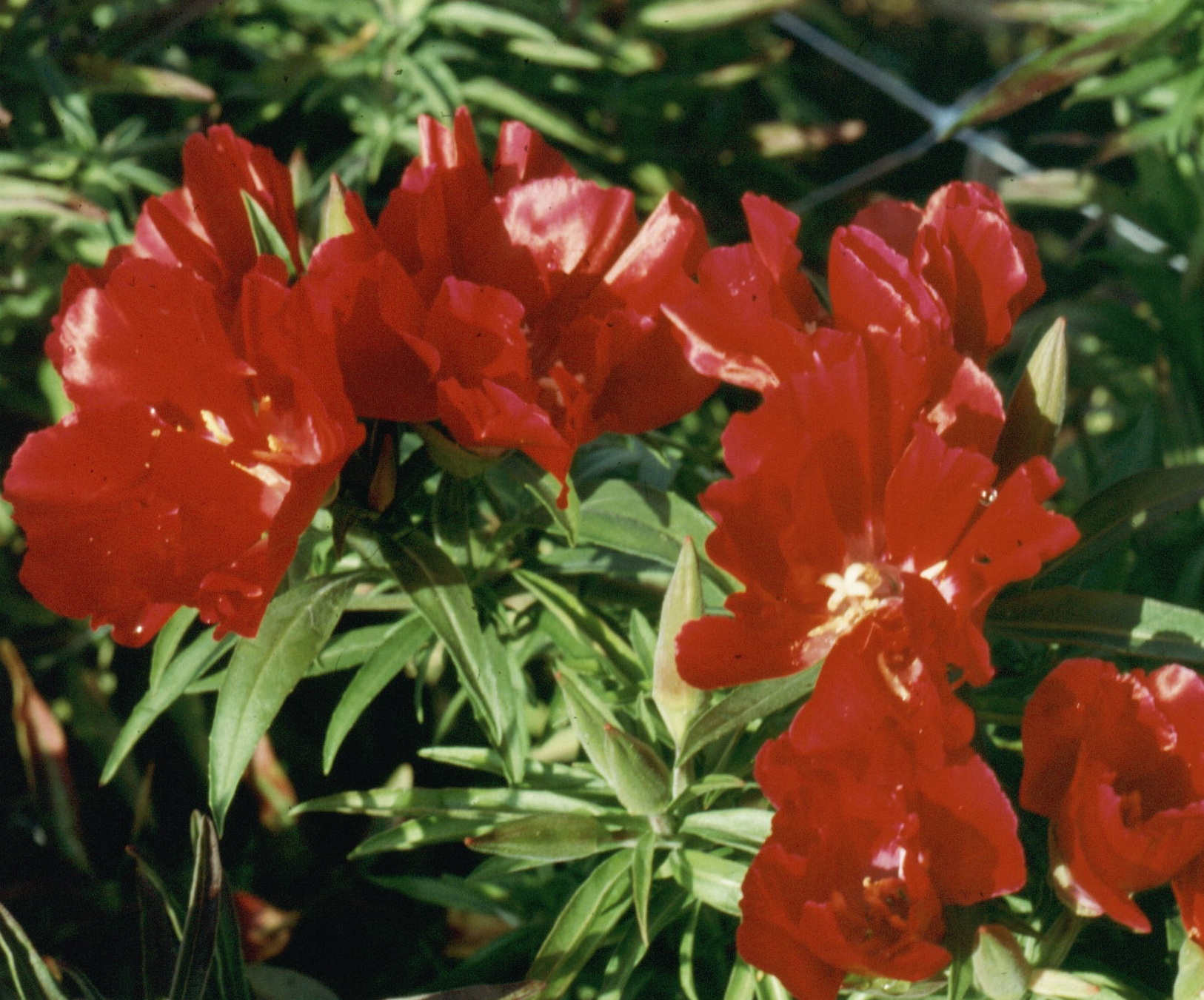
'Maidenblush'

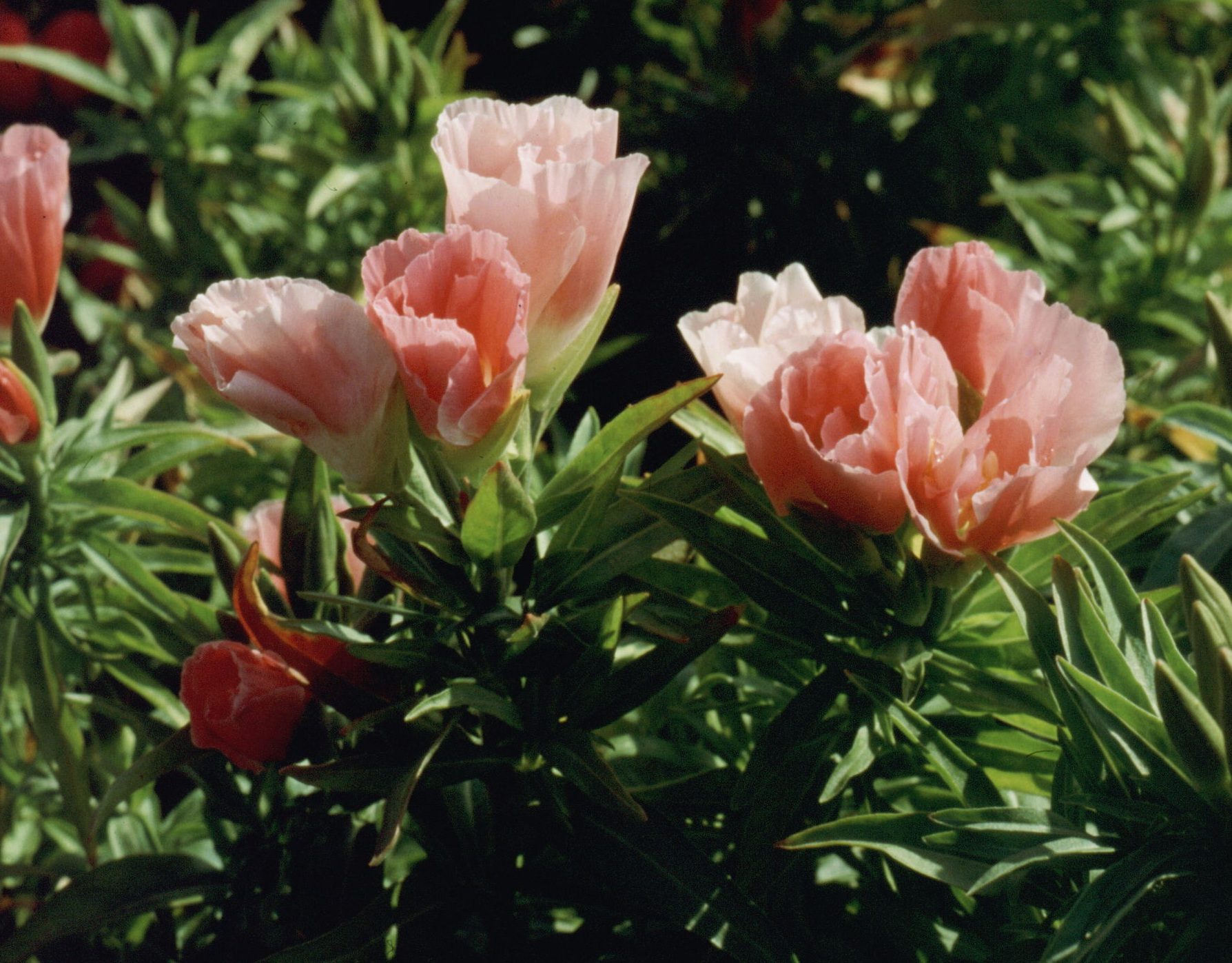
'Miss Nagasaki'

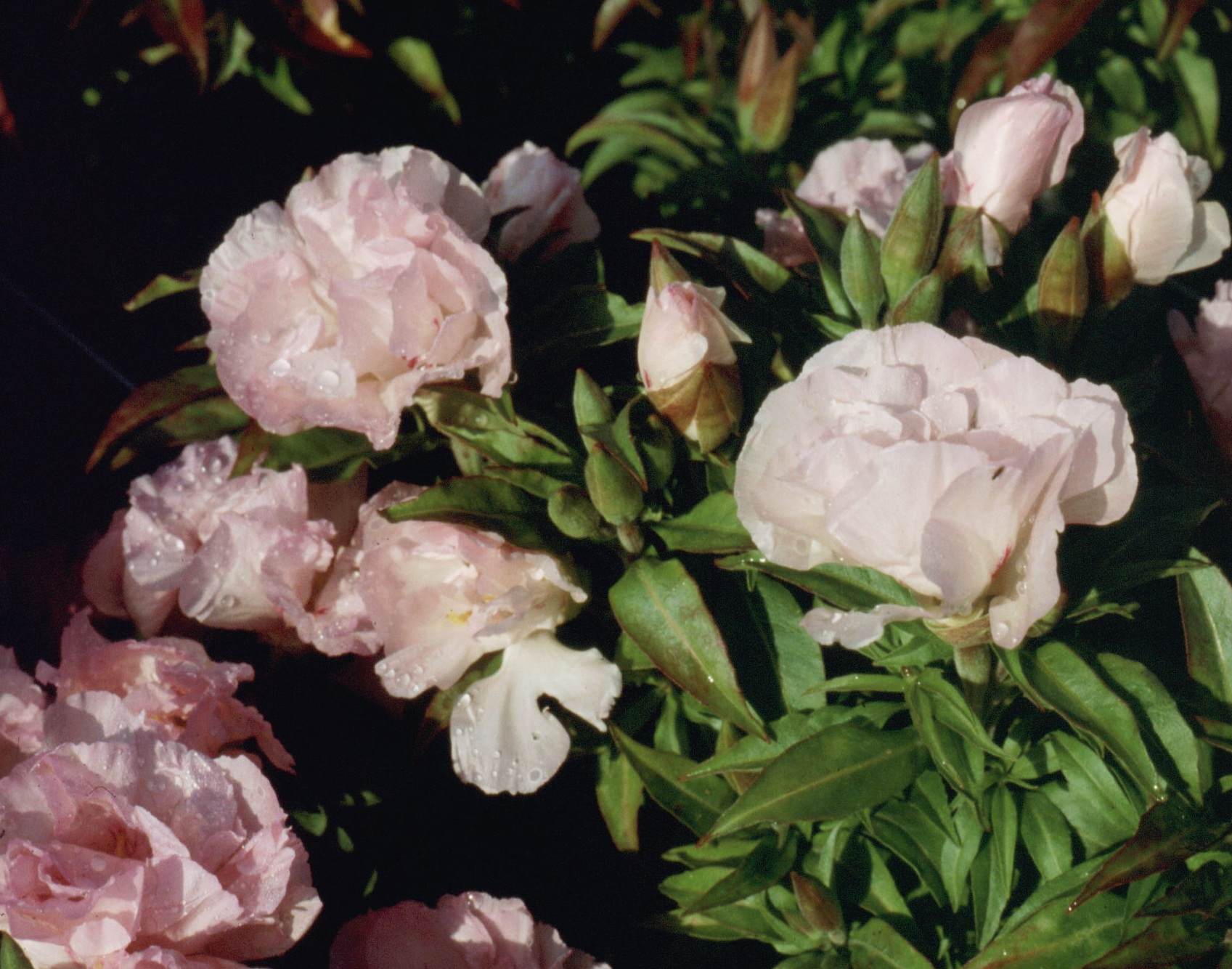
'Sweetheart'

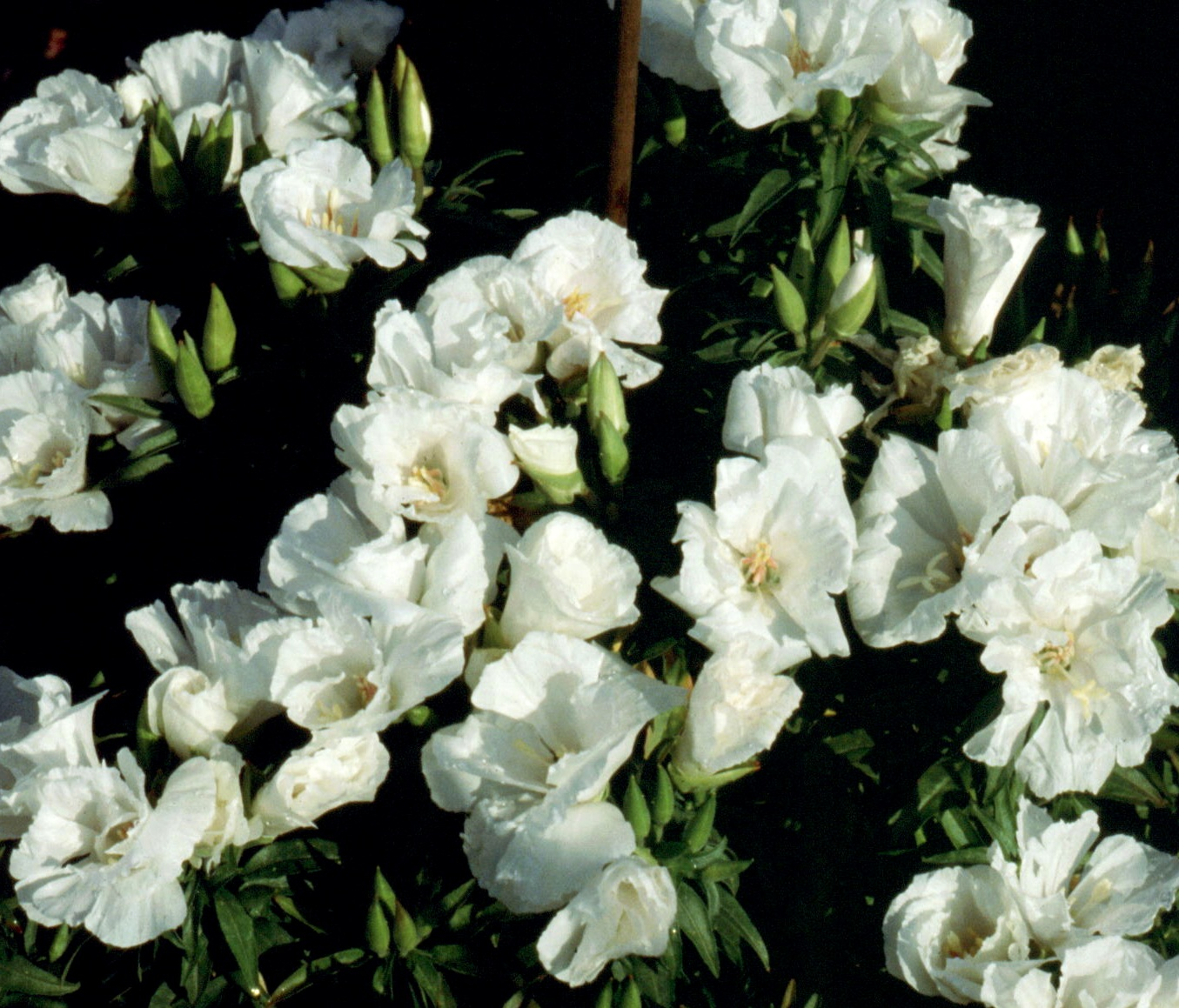
'White Bouquet'

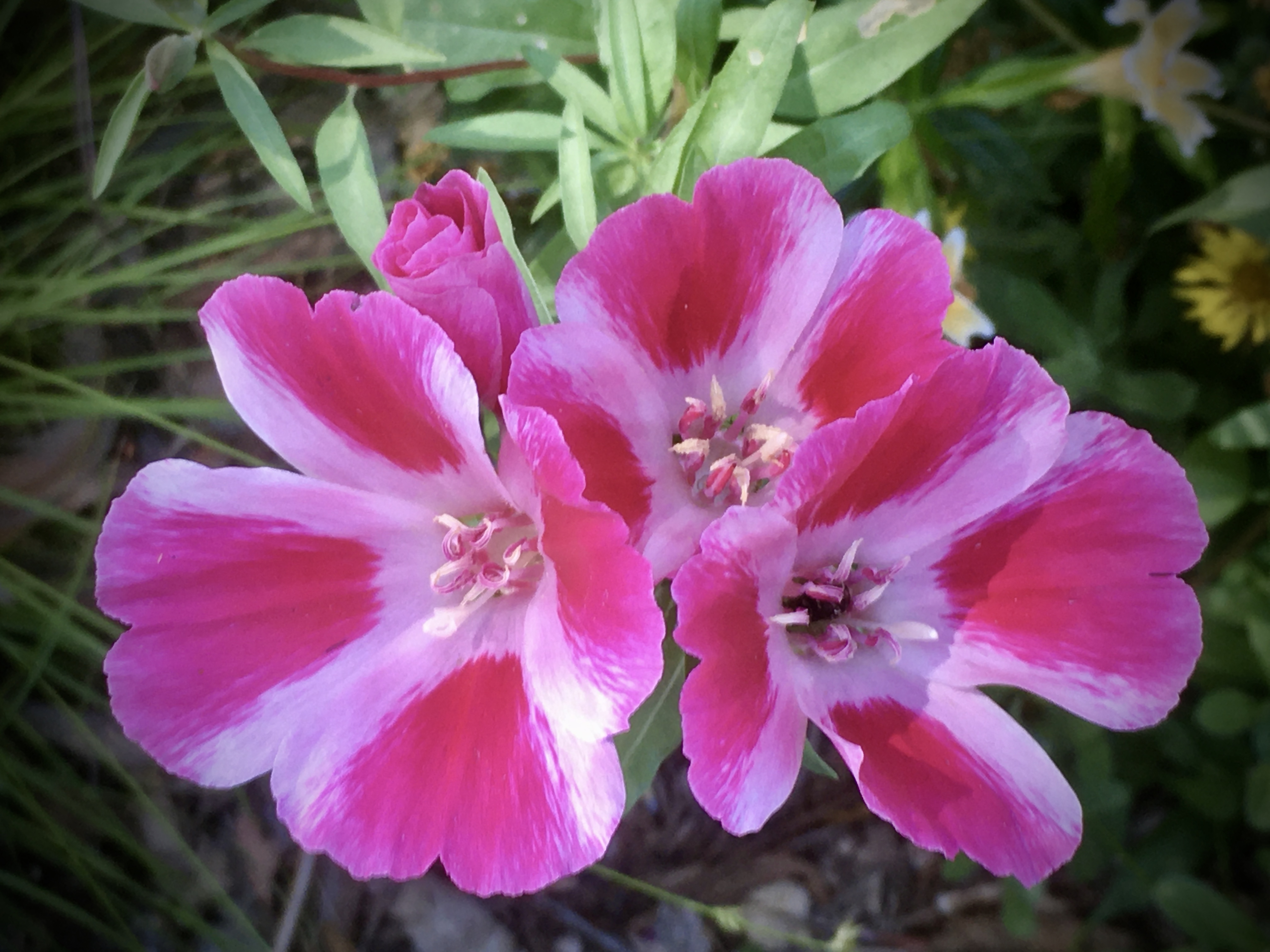
Clarkia amoena at Gamble Garden in Palo Alto, California
