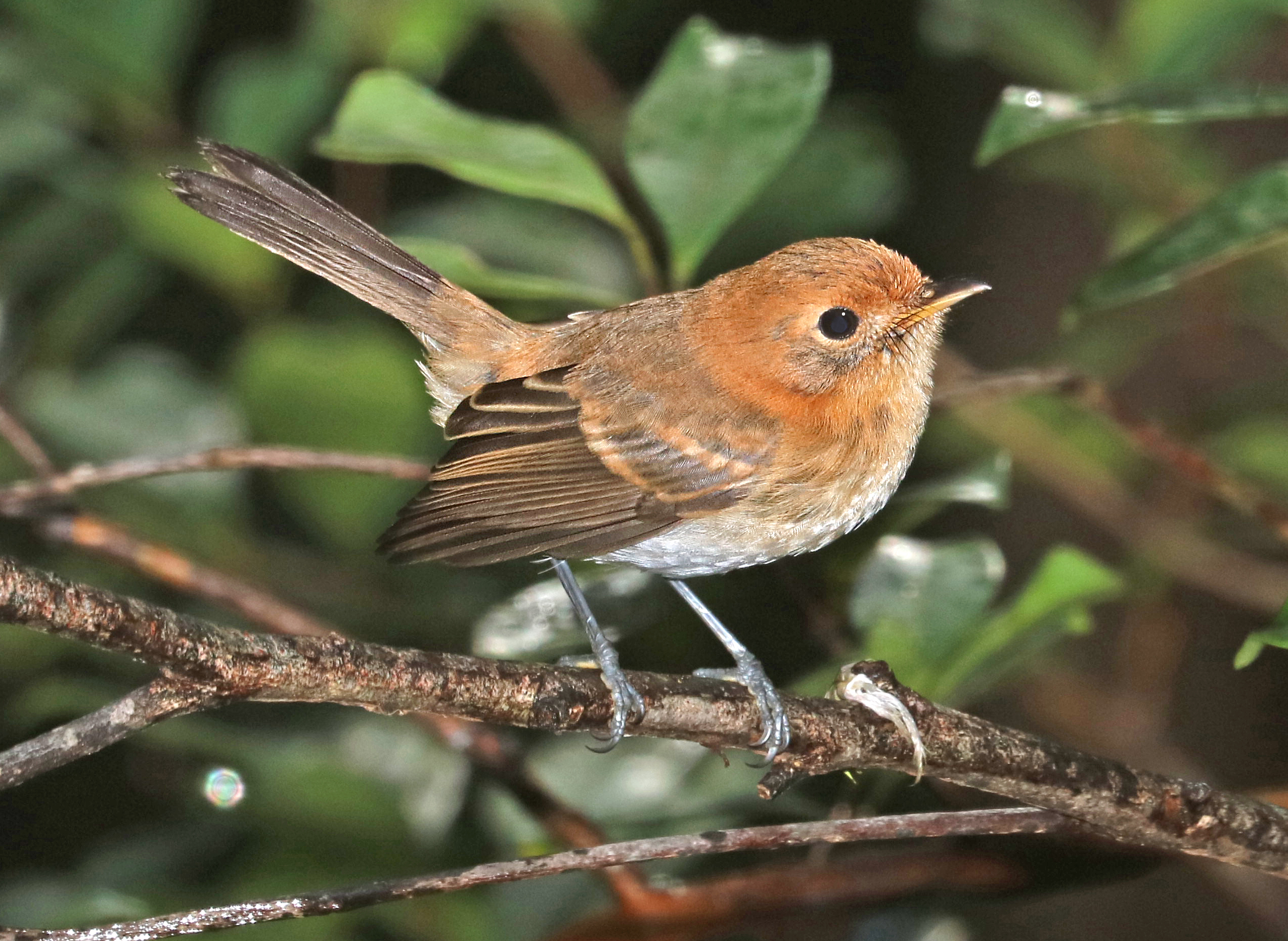
- Oʻahu 'elepaio Chasiempis ibidis

Conservation status
- Vulnerable (IUCN 3.1)

Scientific classification
- Kingdom: Animalia
- Phylum: Chordata
- Class: Aves
- Order: Passeriformes
- Family: Monarchidae
- Genus: Chasiempis
- Species: C. ibidis

Binomial name
- Chasiempis ibidis Stejneger, 1887

Synonyms
- Chasiempis sandwichensis ibidis

= Oʻahu ʻelepaio =

Species of bird

The Oʻahu ʻelepaio (Chasiempis ibidis) is a monarch flycatcher endemic to the Hawaiian Island of Oʻahu. It is one of the three distinct, closely related species of ʻelepaio native to the Hawaiian archipelago, including the Hawaiʻi ʻelepaio and the Kauʻi ʻelepaio. They are found in high elevations on the slopes of Oʻahu and primarily consume insects. They are currently listed as vulnerable by the IUCN Red List, and ongoing work is being done to eliminate invasive predators and disease.

== Taxonomy ==
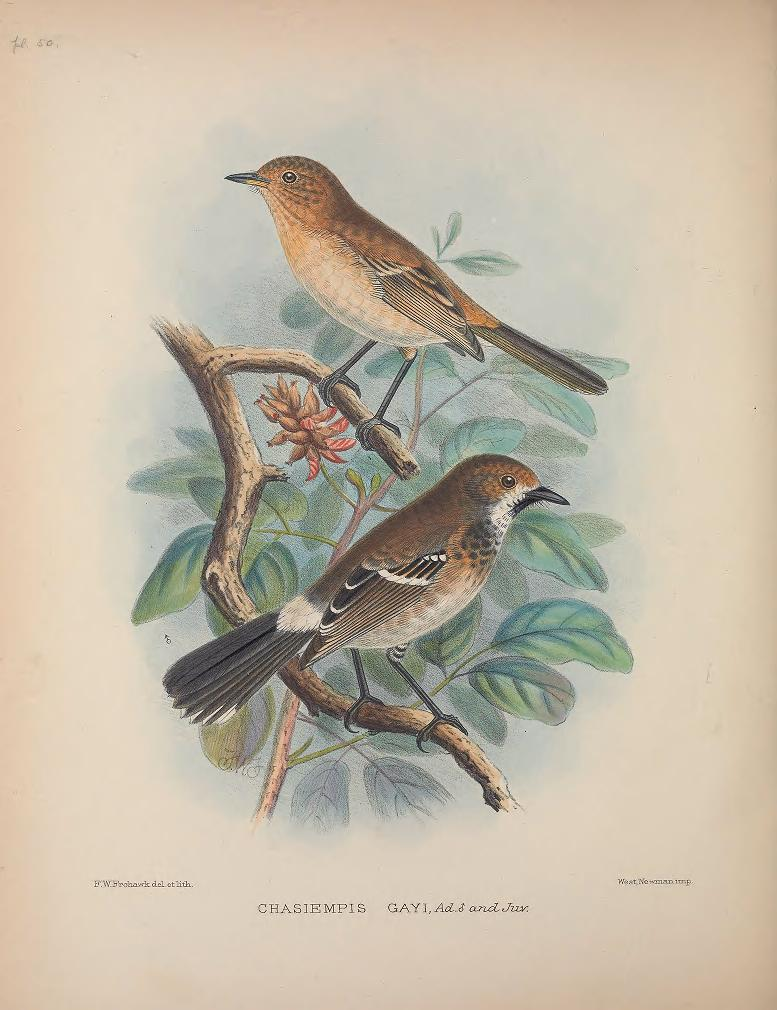
Kau'i 'elepaio (top), O'ahu 'elepaio (bottom)

The Oʻahu ʻelepaio (Chasiempis ibidis) was formerly considered a subspecies of the Hawaiʻi ʻelepaio (Chasiempis sandwichensis), until reclassified as a separate species in 2010. This reclassification was based on phylogenetic differences in ʻelepaios from each island in addition to significant morphological differences that would indicate that they are separate species. Additionally there has been shown to be differences in the songs sung by birds on each island. It has been found that ʻelepaio played a song from a different island are less likely or will not respond to it but are very likely to respond to the song from their own island.The Oʻahu ʻelepaio is in the genus, Chasiempis, containing all ʻelepaio, the family, Monarchidea, the monarch flycatchers, and the order, Passeriformes.

== Description ==
The Oʻahu ʻelepaio in appearance is very similar to the closely related Hawaiʻi ʻelepaio, but the white underside extends to the flanks and further up the breast, and the upper side – especially the head – is more rust-colored, with white wing bars, tail tips, and a black or blue chin on adults, that may have white on their chin. Their bill is medium sized, blunt, and black. Juvenile Oʻahu ʻelepaio have buffy wing bars and are overall more reddish-brown.

== Behavior and ecology ==
=== Habitat ===
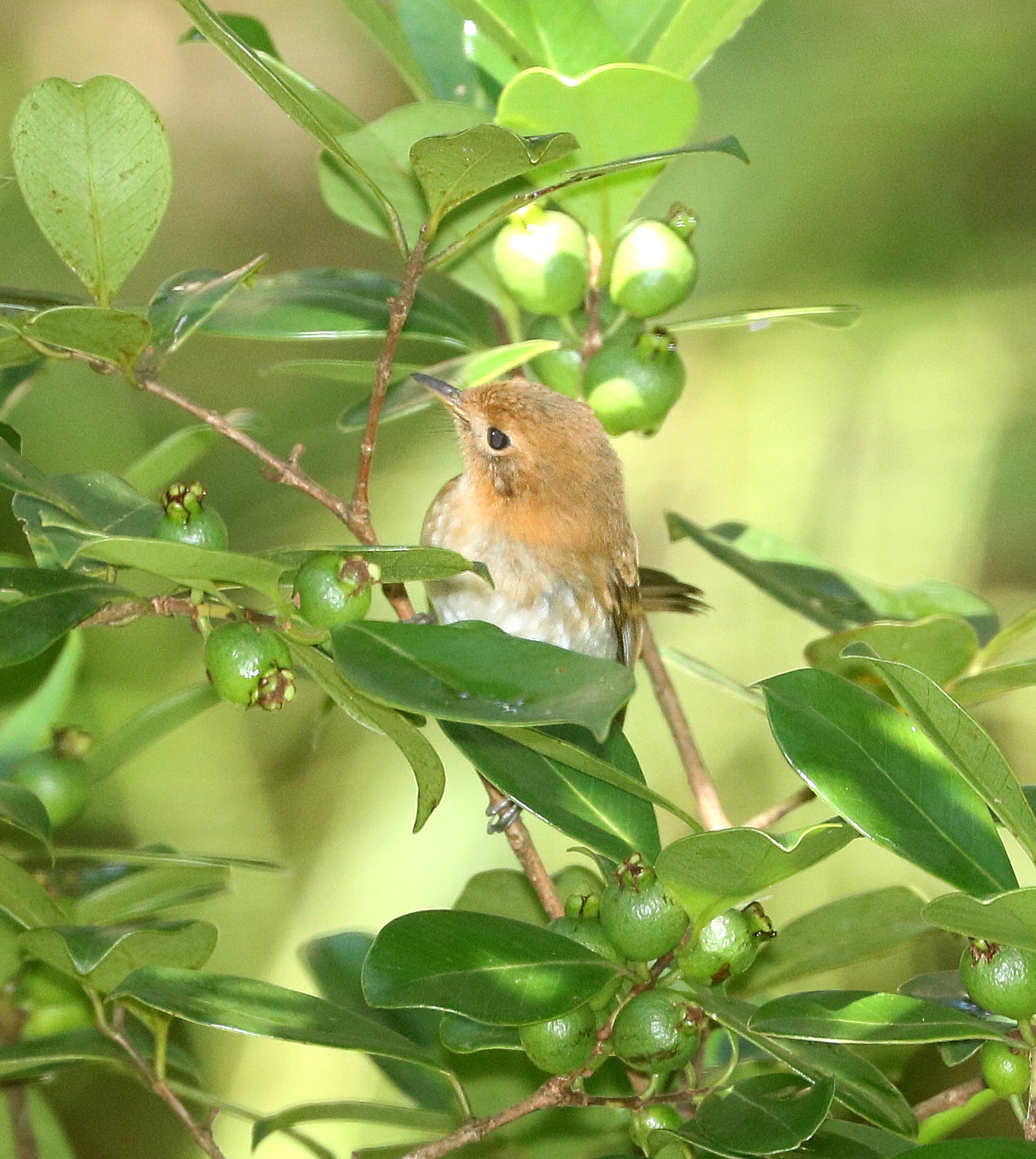
Foraging O'ahu 'elepaio

Oʻahu ʻelepaio are sedentary, meaning they state in one place, and do not migrate. The habitat of the Oʻahu ʻelepaio includes high altitudes on Oʻahu, where it inhabits areas with dense forest undercover, but their habitat can vary.Their habitat consists of both areas high in invasive fauna, and areas that are more predominantly home to old growth native forests.

=== Vocalizations ===
Oʻahu ʻelepaio have a distinct vocalization compared to the Hawaiʻi ʻelepaio and Kauaʻi ʻelepaio. Female Oʻahu ʻelepaio can sing, but singing is mostly done by males of this species. Types of calls made by Oʻahu ʻelepaio include chips, chatters, songs, and alarm calls, with chatter being the most common. Oʻahu ʻelepaio are the first in the morning and last at night to be observed singing.

=== Feeding behavior ===
The Oʻahu ʻelepaio is most often found foraging in the lower canopy of high-altitude forests on Oʻahu, in what is often high insect density areas, where it preys on insects, arachnids, chilopods, diplopods, and occasionally mollusks. They are very opportunistic, relying on areas where it is easiest to obtain food, however they tend to stay within them own territory.

=== Breeding behavior ===
The Oʻahu ʻelepaio's courtship, copulation and nesting behavior occurs within their own territories, where they engage in singing, chasing courtship displays, from the age of one year old. Breeding typically occurs during the months of November through July. Nests are built in the forks of trees or on lateral branches, but forks of trees are the most common. The nest is built by both the male and female and contains a large variety of materials including, spider web, lichen, fur, bark, leaves of grass, "pulu" of the tree fern, fine rootlets, and leaf skeletons. They lay between 2-3 eggs, white with reddish brown spots on the larger end, and both the male and female participate in incubation. It has been observed that the male will feed their mates during incubation, which typically lasts around 14-16 days, where the eggs hatch to reveal dark pink skinned hatchlings with sparse black down, and an orange gape. Fecal sacs of the young are removed and swallowed by the adults. Oʻahu ʻelepaio can have around 2 broods per breeding season, and the young stays with their parents until they reach sexual maturity at 1 year old and disperse.

=== 'Anting' behavior ===
The Oʻahu ʻelepaio participates is a behavior known as 'Anting' when a bird rubs ants or other organisms onto their skin or feathers. It is particularly significant in the Oʻahu ʻelepaio because of observations of them anting with two invasive species, the garlic snail, and christmas berry, which contain chemical toxins not found endemically on the island. This behavior is thought to be a control for ectoparasites in this species, but those general behavior among all bird species, including the Oʻahu ʻelepaio needs further study.

== Threats ==
=== Mosquito-borne diseases ===
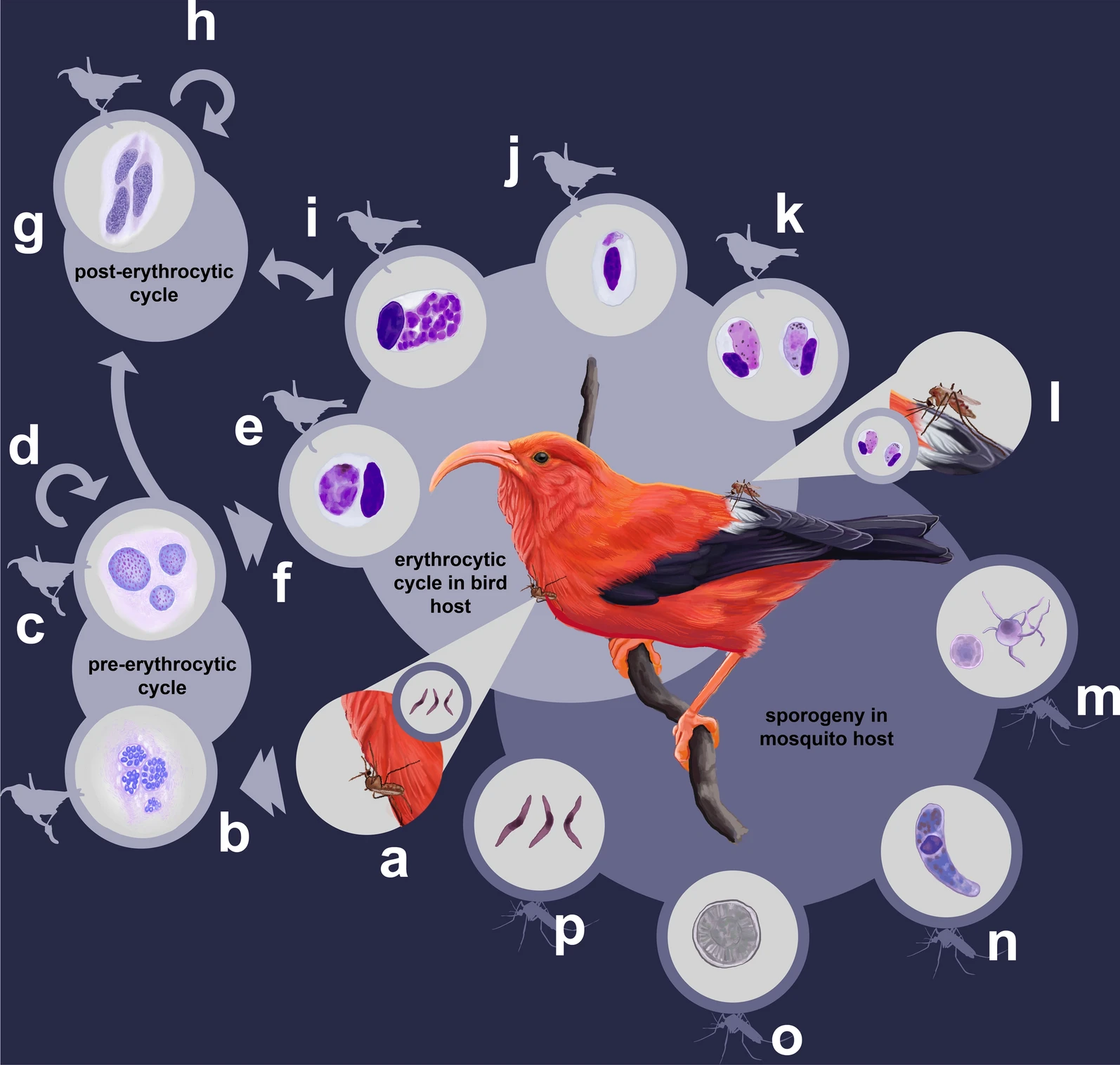
Avian Malaria Life Cycle

Mosquito-borne diseases such as avian malaria and fowlpox are widespread in the Oʻahu ʻelepaio population and although the population appears to have weathered the worst of it through what appears to be heightened disease resistance, it is still affected by these diseases, particularly in wetter areas where mosquito populations are greater. The Oʻahu ʻelepaio is less affected by mosquito borne diseases compared to the island's endemic honeycreepers, and its range is not affected by mosquito populations, unlike Oʻahu's endemic honeycreepers.

=== Invasive species ===
Predation of nestlings, eggs and adult females by invasive rodents, is a major threat when it comes to the prevenance of the Oʻahu ʻelepaio. Additionally, the presence of non-native foliage appears to play a role in increased nest predation of the Oʻahu ʻelepaio. In areas where rodents are controlled, survival and nest success are higher. It appears that in areas were rodent-control does not occur, young birds looking to establish territory face greater death rates and less nest success creating a population sink. Finally, it has been found that nest height in the Oʻahu ʻelepaio has increased over time in response to invasive predation, and an increasing number of nests are now built high enough that invasive predators are less likely to have an effect on them.

=== Population size ===
The species is now restricted to an area of 47 square kilometres (18 sq mi) in the Koʻolau and Waiʻanae ranges, where a fragmented population of 1,200–1,400 birds occur. Recently completed surveys of populations in the Koʻolau range have unexpectedly revealed that the population has largely remained stable since surveys conducted in the 1990s. However, only about 30 individuals are left on the windward side of the Koʻolau range, with some valleys containing only a single ʻelepaio. Without intervention, the population risks extinction due to its small population.

=== Anthropogenic climate change ===
Specifically, not much is known about the threats climate change holds over this species and needs greater study. However, climate change's effect on rainfall periods, is changing the way the Oʻahu ʻelepaio nests. Instead of nesting during its normal period of November-July, since 2015 there have consistently been significant observations of the birds nesting during the off season, August-October. This was correlated with increased rainfall, causing higher abundance of food sources, and due to the Oʻahu ʻelepaio's greater disease resistance, it continues to adapt to wetter seasons, in this case with changes in nesting behavior.

== Conservation ==
The Oʻahu ʻelepaio is currently listed as vulnerable as defined by the IUCN Red List in 2023, after being previously listed as endangered. It is still however listed as endangered, by the State of Hawaiʻi, and federally, under the Endangered Species Act. Efforts currently being made to protect this species include rodent control, and protection of what is defined as critical habitat.
