= S. antiqua =

S. antiqua may refer to one of the following species:

- Sivanasua, an extinct genus of carnivorous mammal
- Succinea antiqua, an extinct land snail species
- Sultanuvaisia, an extinct fish species
