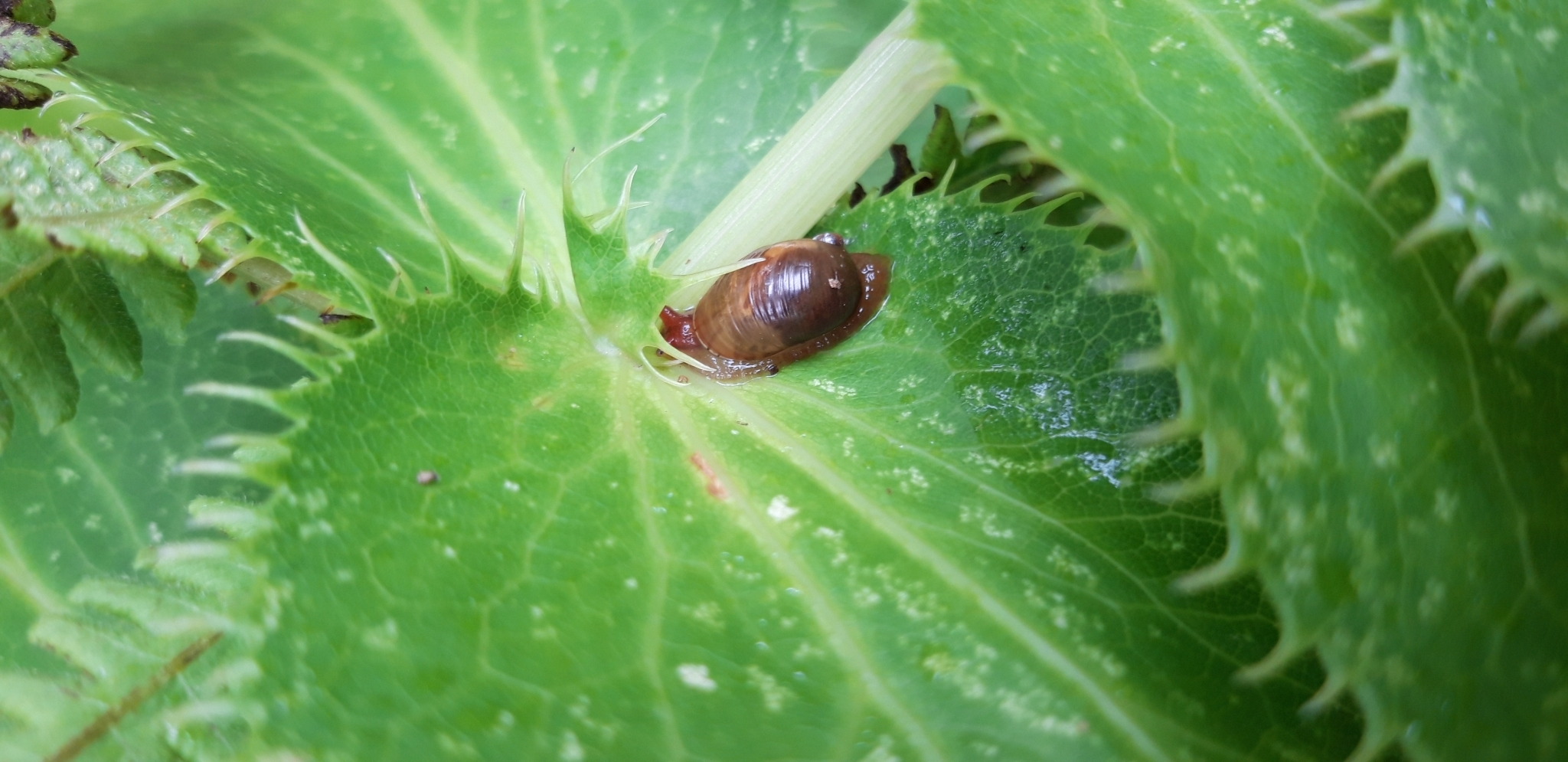

Conservation status
- Near Threatened (IUCN 2.3)

Scientific classification
- Kingdom: Animalia
- Phylum: Mollusca
- Class: Gastropoda
- Order: Stylommatophora
- Family: Succineidae
- Genus: Succinea
- Species: S. sanctaehelenae

Binomial name
- Succinea sanctaehelenae (Lesson, 1830)

= Succinea sanctaehelenae =

Species of gastropod

Succinea sanctaehelenae is a species of land snail in the family Succineidae, the amber snails. It is known commonly as the blushing snail. It is endemic to the island of Saint Helena in the South Atlantic Ocean.
