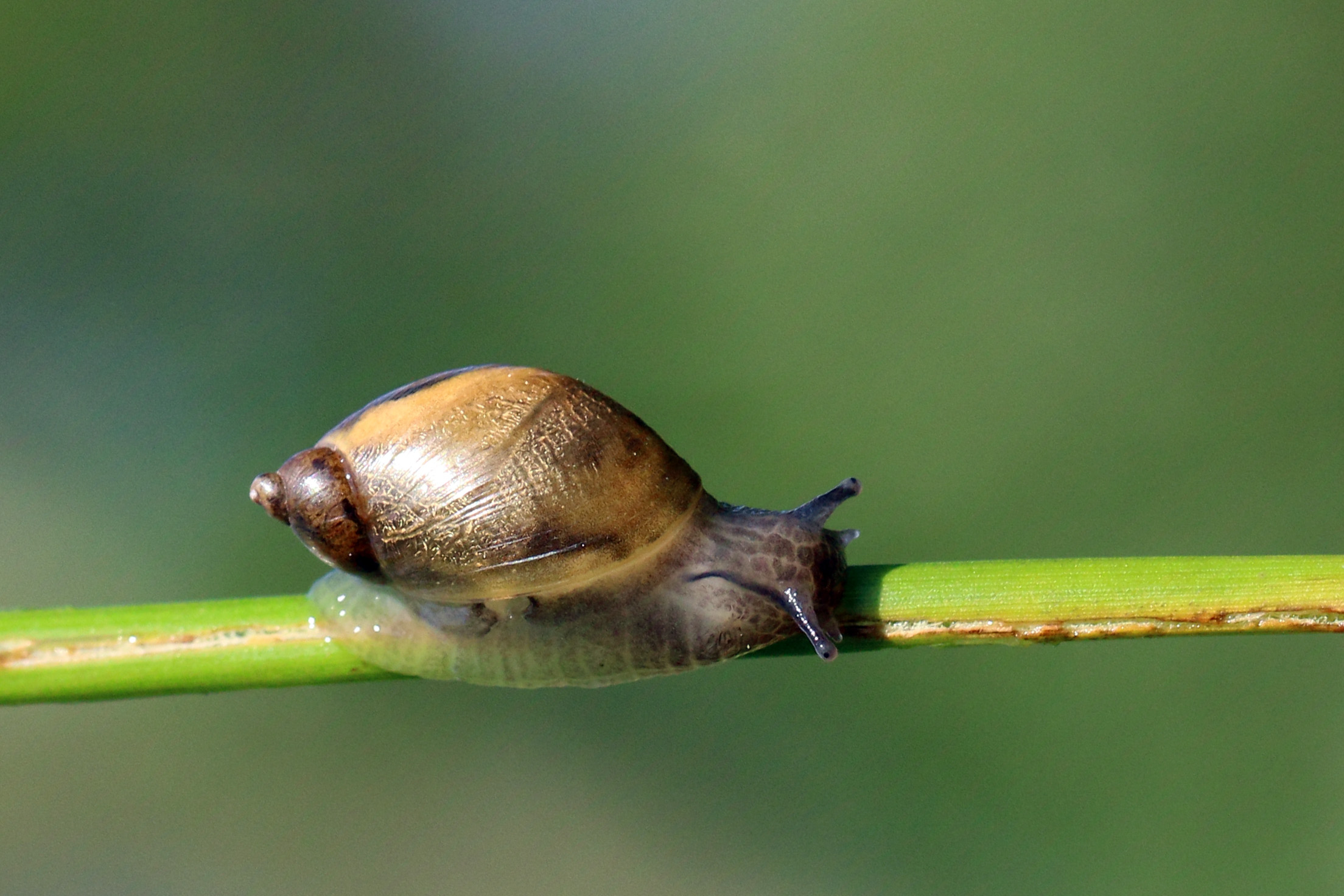
- Succinea putris in Oxfordshire

Scientific classification
- Kingdom: Animalia
- Phylum: Mollusca
- Class: Gastropoda
- Order: Stylommatophora
- Superfamily: Succineoidea
- Family: Succineidae
- Subfamily: Succineinae
- Genus: Succinea; Draparnaud, 1801

Type species
- Helix putris Linnaeus, 1758

Species
- See text

Synonyms
- Amphibina W. Hartmann, 1821; Amphibulima Gistel, 1848 (Invalid: unnecessary substitute name for Succinea; also a junior homonym of Amphibulima Lamarck, 1805); Arborcinea Iredale, 1937; † Brachyspira L. Pfeiffer, 1855; Cerinasota Iredale, 1939; Cochlohydra A. Férussac, 1821; Glischrus (Tapada) S. Studer, 1820 (junior synonym); Helix (Cochlohydra) A. Férussac, 1821 (junior synonym); Lucena Hartmann, 1821; Succinastrum J. Mabille, 1871; Succinea (Amphibina) W. Hartmann, 1821 (junior synonym); Succinea (Brachyspira) L. Pfeiffer, 1855· accepted, alternate representation; Succinea (Calcisuccinea) Pilsbry, 1948· accepted, alternate representation; Succinea (Desmosuccinea) Webb, 1954· accepted, alternate representation; Succinea (Heysuccinea) Webb, 1953· accepted, alternate representation; Succinea (Kondosuccinea) Patterson, 1989· accepted, alternate representation; Succinea (Papusuccinea) Solem, 1959· accepted, alternate representation; Succinea (Succinea) Draparnaud, 1801· accepted, alternate representation; Succinea (Tapada) S. Studer, 1820; Tapada S. Studer, 1820; Truella Pease, 1871

= Succinea =

Genus of gastropods

Succinea, common name the amber snails, is a large genus of small, air-breathing land snails, terrestrial pulmonate gastropod molluscs in the family Succineidae.

The common name refers to the fact that live snails in this genus are translucent and similar to amber in appearance.

== Description ==
The length of the shell ranges between 9.4–17 millimetres (0.37–0.67 in); the width ranges between 6.8–11.5 millimetres (0.27–0.45 in).

The dextrous, pointed ovoid shell consists of 3⅓–3½ whorls. It is thin-walled, glossy and translucent. The protoconch is very compact. The spire is short and consists mainly of a large, wide body whorl and an oval aperture with a sharp angle at the top. The deep sutures are prominent.The interior surface of the aperture is cream-colored or white.

The shell is usually light brown, but may be whitish with gray or light yellow streaks.

The large body cannot be completely withdrawn within the shell. The lower pair of tentacles is vestigial.

The many species in this genus are difficult to distinguish. Sometimes they need dissecting to confirm identification through the shape of the jaw and character of the reproductive system.

== Distribution ==
This large genus has a worldwide distribution. Species in this genus usually live in damp habitats such as marshes. Some species are amphibious.

== Species ==
Species within the genus Succinea include:

- Succinea aegyptiaca Ehrenberg, 1831
- Succinea aequinoctialis d'Orbigny, 1837
- Succinea africana F. Krauss, 1848
- Succinea alpestris Möllendorff, 1875
- Succinea amoi C. M. Cooke & Clench, 1945
- Succinea ampulacea E. von Martens, 1898
- Succinea andecola Crawford, 1939
- Succinea angustior (C. B. Adams, 1850)
- † Succinea antiqua Colbeau, 1867
- Succinea aperta I. Lea, 1838
- Succinea apicalis Ancey, 1904
- Succinea approximans Shuttleworth, 1854
- Succinea approximata G. B. Sowerby II, 1872
- Succinea arangoi Pfeiffer, 1866 (taxon inquirendum)
- Succinea arboricola Connolly, 1912
- Succinea archeyi Powell, 1933
- Succinea argentina Miquel, Rapacioli & Meneghini, 2019
- Succinea arundinetorum Heude, 1882
- Succinea aurita Hylton Scott, 1951
- Succinea aurulenta Ancey, 1889
- Succinea australis (Férussac, 1821)
- Succinea baconi L. Pfeiffer, 1855
- Succinea badia Morelet, 1867
- Succinea bakeri Hubricht, 1963
- † Succinea baoyueensis W. Yü & X.-Q. Zhang, 1982
- Succinea barbadensis Guilding, 1828
- Succinea baumanni Sturany, 1894
- Succinea bequaerti Pilsbry, 1919
- Succinea bermudensis L. Pfeiffer, 1857
- Succinea bernardii Récluz, 1852
- † Succinea bertrandi Fontannes, 1884
- Succinea bettii E. A. Smith, 1877
- Succinea bicolorata Ancey, 1889
- † Succinea boissyi Deshayes, 1863
- Succinea brevis Dunker in Pfeiffer, 1850
- † Succinea brevispira Deshayes, 1863
- Succinea burmeisteri Döring, 1873
- Succinea caduca Mighels, 1845
- Succinea californica P. Fischer and Crosse, 1878 – San Tomas ambersnail
- Succinea campestris Say, 1817 – Crinkled Ambersnail
- Succinea canella A. Gould, 1846
- Succinea carectorum Heude, 1882
- Succinea carmenensis P. Fischer & Crosse, 1878
- Succinea casta Ancey, 1899
- Succinea cepulla A. Gould, 1846
- Succinea ceylanica Pfeiffer, 1855
- Succinea chinensis L. Pfeiffer, 1857
- Succinea chudeaui Germain, 1907
- Succinea cinnamomea Ancey, 1889
- Succinea clarionensis Dall, 1926
- Succinea cochinchinensis Crosse & P. Fischer, 1863
- Succinea collina Hanley & Theobald, 1873
- Succinea colorata P. Fischer & Crosse, 1877
- Succinea comorensis Fischer-Piette & Vukadinovic, 1974
- Succinea concordialis A. Gould, 1848
- Succinea congoensis Pilsbry, 1919
- Succinea contenta (Iredale, 1939)
- Succinea contorta C. B. Adams, 1845
- Succinea cordovana P. Fischer & Crosse, 1877
- Succinea costaricana von Martens, 1898
- Succinea costulosa Pease, 1865
- Succinea crassinuclea L. Pfeiffer, 1849
- Succinea crocata A. Gould, 1846
- Succinea cryptica Tillier, 1981
- Succinea cygnorum Pilsbry, 1930
- Succinea dakaensis Sturany, 1898
- Succinea daucina L. Pfeiffer, 1854
- Succinea delicata Ancey, 1889
- Succinea dolphin C. M. Cooke & Clench, 1945
- Succinea dominicensis L. Pfeiffer, 1853
- † Succinea dongyingensis Youluo, 1978
- Succinea donneti L. Pfeiffer, 1853
- Succinea elegantior Annandale, 1921
- Succinea elongata Pease, 1870
- Succinea erythrophana Ancey, 1883
- Succinea eussoensis Preston, 1912
- Succinea exarata F. Krauss, 1848
- Succinea falklandica E. A. Smith, 1884
- Succinea fischeri Gassies, 1871
- Succinea flexilis Quick, 1957
- Succinea floridana Pilsbry, 1905 – Florida chalksnail
- Succinea fulgens Lea, 1841 (taxon inquirendum)
- Succinea garrettiana Ancey, 1899
- Succinea gayana (d'Orbigny, 1835)
- Succinea gibba Henshaw, 1904
- Succinea girnarica Theobald, 1859
- Succinea gladiator Schileyko & Likharev, 1986
- Succinea globispira Martens, 1898
- Succinea godivariana Gude, 1914
- Succinea gracilis I. Lea, 1841
- Succinea grosvenorii I. Lea, 1864 – Santa Rita ambersnail
- Succinea guadelupensis Dall, 1900
- Succinea guatemalensis Morelet, 1849
- Succinea gundlachi Pfeiffer, 1852 (taxon inquirendum)
- Succinea gyrata J. S. Gibbons, 1879
- Succinea hanleyi Gude, 1914
- Succinea hararensis Connolly, 1928
- Succinea haustellum Rehder, 1942
- † Succinea headonensis Wenz, 1919
- † Succinea henanensis Y.-T. Li, 1983
- Succinea hortulana Morelet, 1851
- Succinea humerosa A. Gould, 1846
- Succinea hyalina Shuttleworth, 1854
- † Succinea imperspicua S. V. Wood, 1851
- Succinea indiana Pilsbry, 1905 – xeric ambersnail
- Succinea indica L. Pfeiffer, 1849
- Succinea infundibuliformis A. Gould, 1846
- Succinea interioris Tate, 1894
- Succinea kempi Preston, 1912
- Succinea konaensis Sykes, 1897
- Succinea kuntziana Solem, 1959
- Succinea labiosa Philippi, 1860
- Succinea latior C. B. Adams, 1849
- Succinea lauta A. Gould, 1859
- Succinea lauzannei Germain, 1909
- Succinea lebruni Mabille, 1884
- Succinea lessensis Pilsbry, 1919
- † Succinea lingulata X.-G. Zhu, 1985
- Succinea listeri E. A. Smith, 1889
- Succinea lopesi Lanzieri, 1966
- Succinea lumbalis A. Gould, 1846
- Succinea luteola Gould, 1848 – Mexico ambersnail
- Succinea lutosa Pilsbry, 1926
- Succinea lutulenta Ancey, 1889
- Succinea macgillivrayi Cox, 1864
- Succinea macta Poey, 1858
- Succinea magellanica A. Gould, 1846
- Succinea magnaciana Heude, 1882
- Succinea manaosensis Pilsbry, 1926
- Succinea manuana A. Gould, 1846
- Succinea margarita L. Pfeiffer, 1853
- † Succinea marioni Saporta, 1889
- Succinea martini (Jousseaume, 1887)
- Succinea masafuerae Odhner, 1922
- Succinea masoala Emberton & Griffiths, 2009
- Succinea mauiensis Ancey, 1889
- Succinea maxima Henshaw, 1904
- Succinea mcgregori Pilsbry, 1898
- Succinea meridionalis d'Orbigny, 1846
- Succinea mirabilis Henshaw, 1904
- Succinea modesta A. Gould, 1846
- Succinea monticula C. Semper, 1873
- Succinea montrouzieri Crosse, 1867
- † Succinea nagpurensis Hislop, 1860
- Succinea newcombiana Garrett, 1857
- Succinea nobilis Poey, 1853
- Succinea norfolkensis Sykes, 1900
- Succinea normalis Ancey, 1881
- Succinea nyassana Dupuis & Putzeys, 1923
- Succinea obesa E. von Martens, 1867
- Succinea ochracina Gundlach in Poey, 1858
- Succinea ordinaria E. A. Smith, 1905
- Succinea oregonensis I. Lea, 1841 – Oregon ambersnail
- Succinea orientalis Benson, 1851
- † Succinea palliolum F. Sandberger, 1871
- Succinea panamensis Pilsbry, 1920
- Succinea panucoensis Pilsbry, 1910
- Succinea paralia Hubricht, 1983 – Saltmarsh Ambersnail
- † Succinea parscovensis Cobălcescu, 1883
- Succinea patagonica E. A. Smith, 1881
- Succinea peruviana L. Pfeiffer, 1867
- Succinea philippinica Möllendorff, 1893
- Succinea piratarum Quadras & Möllendorff, 1894
- Succinea princei Preston, 1912
- Succinea pristina Henshaw, 1904
- Succinea propinqua Drouët, 1859
- † Succinea protevoluta Yen, 1969
- Succinea protracta Sykes, 1900
- Succinea pseudomalonyx Dupuis & Putzeys, 1902
- Succinea pudorina A. Gould, 1846
- Succinea pueblensis Crosse & P. Fischer, 1877
- Succinea puna Tomassi & Cuezzo, 2021
- Succinea punctata L. Pfeiffer, 1855
- Succinea putamen A. Gould, 1846
- Succinea putris (Linnaeus, 1758) – European ambersnail
- Succinea quadrasi Möllendorff, 1894
- Succinea quadrata Ancey, 1904
- Succinea quicki van Benthem Jutting, 1964
- Succinea raoi Rao & Mitra, 1976
- Succinea recisa Morelet, 1851 – rustic ambersnail
- Succinea riisei L. Pfeiffer, 1853
- † Succinea rollieri Maillard, 1892
- Succinea rosariensis Döring, 1873
- Succinea rubella Pease, 1871
- Succinea rugosa L. Pfeiffer, 1842
- Succinea rugulosa Morelet, 1872
- Succinea rusticana Gould, 1846 – rustic ambersnail
- Succinea rutilans W. T. Blanford, 1870
- Succinea sagra d'Orbigny, 1842
- † Succinea schumacheri And.
- † Succinea scitula X.-G. Zhu, 1985
- Succinea setchuanensis Heude, 1882
- † Succinea shenyangensis Youluo, 1978
- Succinea simplex L. Pfeiffer, 1855
- Succinea simplicissima Preston, 1912
- Succinea snigdha Rao, 1924
- Succinea socorroensis Dall, 1926
- Succinea solastra Hubricht, 1961 – Lone Star ambersnail
- Succinea solidula L. Pfeiffer, 1849
- Succinea solitaria E. A. Smith, 1887
- † Succinea sparnacensis Deshayes, 1863
- Succinea striata F. Krauss, 1848
- Succinea strigillata A. Adams & Angas, 1864
- Succinea strubelli Strubell, 1895
- Succinea subgranosa L. Pfeiffer, 1850
- † Succinea subpfeifferi Gottschick, 1920
- Succinea tenella Morelet, 1865
- Succinea tenerrima Ancey, 1904
- Succinea tenuis Gundlach in Poey, 1858
- Succinea teragona Ancey, 1904
- Succinea texta Odhner, 1922
- Succinea tornadri Rao, 1924
- † Succinea ubaghsi Bosquet, 1859
- Succinea undulata Say, 1829
- Succinea unicolor Tryon, 1866 – squatty ambersnail
- Succinea urbana Hubricht, 1961 – urban ambersnail
- Succinea vaginacontorta C. B. Lee, 1951
- Succinea venusta A. Gould, 1846
- Succinea vesicalis A. Gould, 1846
- Succinea virgata E. von Martens, 1865
- Succinea vitrea L. Pfeiffer, 1855
- Succinea waianaensis Ancey, 1899
- Succinea wallisi C. M. Cooke & Clench, 1945
- Succinea wilsonii I. Lea, 1864 – golden ambersnail
- Succinea yarkandensis G. Nevill, 1881
- † Succinea zhuoxianensis W. Yü & H.-Z. Pan, 1982

Additional species, taken from IUCN Red List:

- Succinea guamensis Pfeiffer, 1857
- Succinea sanctaehelenae Lesson, 1830

== Synonyms ==
- Succinea aurea Lea, 1841: synonym of Mediappendix vermeta (Say, 1829)
- Succinea barberi (W. B. Marshall, 1926) – Sanibel ambersnail: synonym of Oxyloma barberi (W. B. Marshall, 1926)
- Succinea chittenangoensis Pilsbry, 1908 – Chittenango ovate amber snail: synonym of Novisuccinea chittenangoensis (Pilsbry, 1908)
- Succinea depressa Rang, 1834: synonym of Pellicula depressa (Rang, 1834) (original combination)
- Succinea forsheyi I. Lea, 1864 – spotted ambersnail: synonym of Succinea concordialis A. Gould, 1848
- Succinea gabbi Tryon, 1866 – riblet ambersnail: synonym of Mediappendix gabbii (Tryon, 1866)
- Succinea greerii Tryon, 1866 – dryland ambersnail: synonym of Succinea grosvenorii I. Lea, 1864
- Succinea ovalis Say, 1817 is a synonym for Novisuccinea ovalis (Say, 1817)
- Succinea pennsylvanica Pilsbry, 1948 – Penn ambersnail: synonym of Novisuccinea pennsylvanica (Pilsbry, 1948)
- † Succinea peregrina F. Sandberger, 1872: synonym of †Oxyloma affine (Reuss in Reuss & Meyer, 1849)
- Succinea pseudavara Webb, 1954: synonym of Succinea grosvenorii I. Lea, 1864
- Succinea strigata Pfeiffer, 1855 – striate ambersnail: synonym of Novisuccinea strigata (L. Pfeiffer, 1855)
- Succinea tomentosa L. Pfeiffer, 1855: synonym of Austropeplea tomentosa (L. Pfeiffer, 1855)

== Ecology ==
Parasites of Succinea spp. include:

- Elaphostrongylus spp.

Succinea consume small plants, such as mosses and leaf litter. Succinea campestris in particular is known to live in leaf litter, and is also known to be attracted to light, an unusual characteristic in snails.

In mating, the snails are hermaphrodites and mate reciprocally (both snails transfer sperm into one another). However, many have preferences in what role they take—some actively seek out mates, mounting others' shells, while others do not.
