= Succinea philippinica =

Conservation status
- Data Deficient (IUCN 3.1)

Scientific classification
- Kingdom: Animalia
- Phylum: Mollusca
- Class: Gastropoda
- Order: Stylommatophora
- Family: Succineidae
- Genus: Succinea
- Species: S. philippinica

Binomial name
- Succinea philippinica Möllendorff, 1893

Species of gastropod

Succinea philippinica is a species of air-breathing land snail, a terrestrial gastropod mollusc in the family Succineidae, the amber snails.

== Distribution ==
This species is endemic to Palau.
