= Succinea konaensis =

Scientific classification
- Kingdom: Animalia
- Phylum: Mollusca
- Class: Gastropoda
- Order: Stylommatophora
- Family: Succineidae
- Genus: Succinea
- Species: S. konaensis

Binomial name
- Succinea konaensis Sykes, 1897

Species of land snail

Succinea konaensis is a terrestrial pulmonate gastropod mollusk in the family Succineidae endemic to Hawaii. The species is one of Hawaii's nine state snails, known in Hawaiian as Hini Hini Kua Mauna.

This species has a brown shell and a typical Succinea morphology. Unlike many other snails, it can not retract into its shell due to the large size of its body compared to the smaller shell. Succinea konaensis is an endemic species to the island of Hawaii. It can be found in Kona, Hilo, Ka'u and on Mauna Kea. It lives mostly on the ground rather than plants. Succinea konaensis is found in a much more reduced area than in the past. This species' conservation status is imperiled. Hawaii's governor, Josh Green, remarked that land snails are a huge part of music and the arts in Hawaiian culture. In 2024, Succinea konaensis was designated as the official snail of Hawaii Island.
