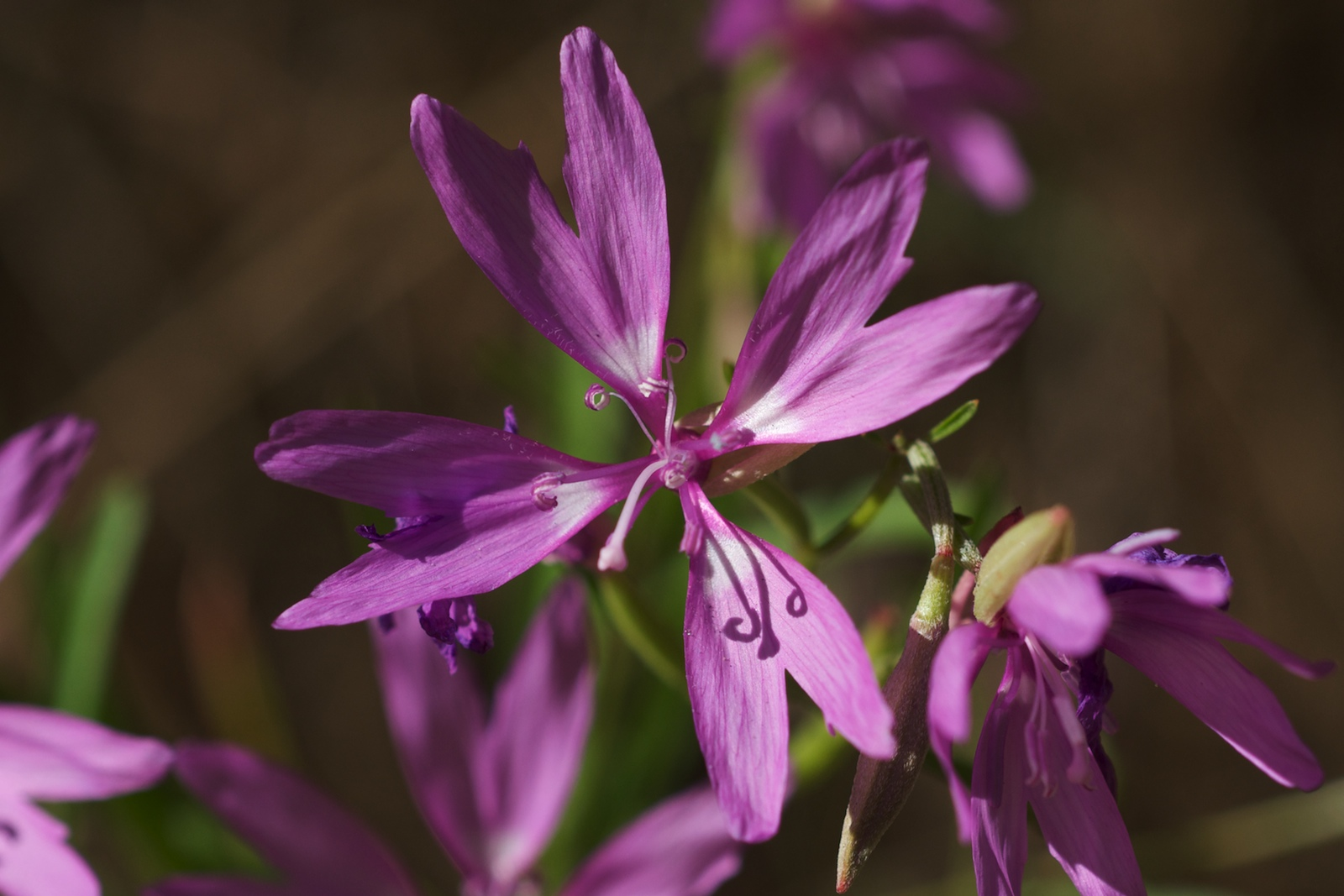

Scientific classification
- Kingdom: Plantae
- Clade: Tracheophytes
- Clade: Angiosperms
- Clade: Eudicots
- Clade: Rosids
- Order: Myrtales
- Family: Onagraceae
- Genus: Clarkia
- Species: C. biloba

Binomial name
- Clarkia biloba (Durand) A.Nels. & J.F.Macbr.

= Clarkia biloba =

Twolobe clarkia

Species of flowering plant

Clarkia biloba is a species of flowering plant in the evening primrose family known by the common name twolobe clarkia and two lobed clarkia.

Clarkia biloba is endemic to California, where it is known from the Sierra Nevada foothills; one subspecies can also be found in the San Francisco Bay Area. It grows in chaparral, oak woodlands, and yellow pine forest habitats.

As the putative progenitor species of Clarkia lingulata it is often used in examples of evolution outside the usual model of allopatric speciation. As such this plant is one of the best plant examples when considering "quantum speciation", a concept closely aligned with peripatric speciation, parapatric speciation and sympatric speciation.

== Description ==
Clarkia biloba is an annual herb producing an erect stem approaching 1 metre (3.3 ft) in maximum height. The leaves are linear to lance-shaped and up to 6 centimeters long. Each is borne on a short petiole.

The top of the erect stem is occupied by the inflorescence, which bears hanging buds above open flowers. The pink or red-purple sepals remain fused as the petals spread and emerge from one side of the bud. The petals are up to 2.5 centimeters long and pink to lavender to magenta, sometimes flecked with red. Each petal has a two-lobed tip. There are 8 stamens, some with large lavender anthers and some with smaller, paler anthers. The stigma protrudes past the stamens.

=== Subspecies ===
There are three subspecies of this wildflower.

- Clarkia biloba ssp. australis — Mariposa clarkia; the rarest, known only in the Merced River drainage in the Sierra foothills; threatened by road maintenance and introduced species.
- Clarkia biloba ssp. biloba — two lobed clarkia
- Clarkia biloba ssp. brandegeeae — Brandegee's clarkia
