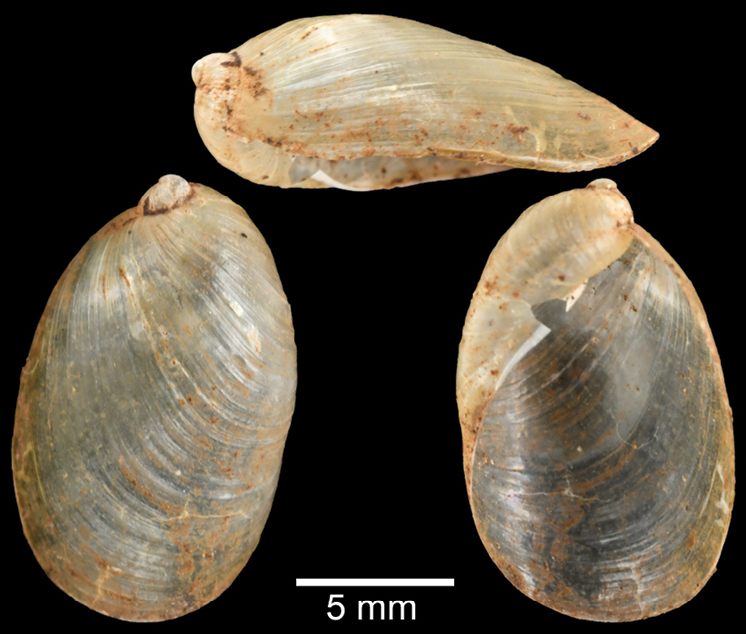
- Succinea tenella

Conservation status
- Secure (NatureServe)

Scientific classification
- Kingdom: Animalia
- Phylum: Mollusca
- Class: Gastropoda
- Order: Stylommatophora
- Family: Succineidae
- Genus: Succinea
- Species: S. tenella

Binomial name
- Succinea tenella Morelet, 1865

= Succinea tenella =

Species of gastropod

Succinea tenella is a species of air-breathing land snail, a terrestrial pulmonate gastropod mollusc in the family Succineidae, the amber snails.

== Distribution ==
This species is already established in the USA, and is considered to represent a potentially serious threat as a pest, an invasive species which could negatively affect agriculture, natural ecosystems, human health or commerce. Therefore it has been suggested that this species be given top national quarantine significance in the USA.
