= List of Hawaii state symbols =

Map of the state of Hawaiʻi and the rest of the United States of America

The state of Hawaii has adopted numerous symbols.

== Insignia ==
Type	Symbol	Description	Year	Image	Source
Flag	The Flag of Hawaiʻi	Adopted in the mid-19th century by the Hawaiian Kingdom, it became the official state flag when Hawaiʻi was admitted as the 50th state of the United States in 1959.	1845	Hawaii flag	
Seal	The Great Seal of the State of Hawaiʻi	Based on the Royal Arms of the Kingdom of Hawaiʻi used during the reigns of Kamehameha III, Kalākaua and Liliʻuokalani, designed by the College of Arms in London in 1842 and officially adopted in 1845	1845	Hawaii seal	
Motto	"Ua Mau ke Ea o ka ʻĀina i ka Pono" ("The life of the land is perpetuated in righteousness")	Spoken by Kamehameha III, the King of Hawaiʻi, on July 31, 1843, when the sovereignty of the Kingdom of Hawaiʻi was returned by the British through the restorative actions of Admiral Richard Darton Thomas, following the brief takeover by Lord George Paulet.	1843	The phrase is engraved on the corner stone of Honolulu Hale, the Honolulu City Hall	
Popular name	"The Aloha State"	A nickname based on the word aloha, commonly used as a greeting in the Hawaiian language.	1959	A license plate of Hawaii with the nickname on it	

== Species ==
Type	Symbol	Description	Year	Image	Source
Bird	Nēnē; Branta sandvicensis	Also known as the Hawaiian goose	1988	Nēnē	
Endemic tree	ʻŌhiʻa lehua Metrosideros polymorpha	A species of flowering evergreen tree in the myrtle family, Myrtaceae, that is endemic to the state.	2022	ʻŌhiʻa lehua	
Fish	Humuhumunukunukuāpuaʻa; Rhinecanthus rectangulus	Also known as the reef triggerfish	2006	Humuhumunukunukuāpuaʻa	
Flower	Pua aloalo or maʻo hau hele Hibiscus brackenridgei A. Gray	Also known as the native yellow hibiscus	1988	Hibiscus brackenridgei	
Insect	Pulelehua; Vanessa tameamea	Also known as the Kamehameha butterfly	2009	Pulelehua	
Land mammal	ʻŌpeʻapeʻa; Lasiurus cinereus semotus	Also known as the Hawaiian hoary bat	2015	ʻŌpeʻapeʻa	
Limu (algae)	Limu kala Sargassum echinocarpum		2023		
Mammal	Hawaiian monk seal Neomonachus schauinslandi	Known in Hawaiian as the ʻīlioholoikauaua	2008	ʻĪlioholoikauaua	
Marine mammal	Humpback whale Megaptera novaeangliae	Known in Hawaiian as the koholā	1979	Koholā	
Plant	Kalo; Colocasia esculenta (L.) Schott	Also known as taro	2007	Kalo	
Shrimp	‘Ōpae ‘ula Halocaridina rubra	Also known as the Hawaiian red shrimp	2025	‘Opae ‘ula	
Snails (kāhuli)	Succinea konaensis Lyropupa striatula Pleuropoma laciniosa kahoolawensis Auriculella lanaiensis Laminella venusta (pictured); Kaala subrutila Erinna newcombi Collonista verruca Endodonta christenseni	Nine endemic snail species, one for each of the main Hawaiian islands	2024	Laminella venusta	
Tree	Kukui tree Aleurites moluccanus	Also known as the candlenut tree	1959	Kukui tree	

== Geology ==
Type	Symbol	Description	Year	Image	Source
Gemstone	Black coral	Known in Hawaiian as the ʻēkaha kū moana	1987	ʻĒkaha kū moana	

== Culture ==
Type	Symbol	Description	Year	Image	Source
ʻAuana (modern) musical instrument	ʻUkulele	A type of lute popularized in Hawaiʻi	2015	Ukulele	
Dance	Hula	A traditional dance and chant of Native Hawaiians	1999	Hula	
Gesture	Shaka	A friendly gesture associated with Hawaiʻi and surf culture	2024	A hand making the shaka symbol	
Individual sport	Surfing	Known in Hawaiian as heʻe nalu	1998	Surfing	
Kahiko (traditional) musical instrument	Pahu	Drums in Hawaiian culture	2015	Pahu	
Language	Hawaiian and English		1978	Hawaiian and English	
Song	"Hawaiʻi Ponoʻī"	It previously served as the national anthem of the independent Hawaiian Kingdom during the late 19th century, as well as the Republic of Hawaiʻi, and has continued to be Hawaiʻi's official anthem ever since annexation by the United States in 1898.	1876		
Spirit	The Aloha Spirit	"The coordination of mind and heart within each person"	1986	Aloha	
Team sport	Outrigger canoe paddling	Known in Hawaiian as heihei waʻa	1986	Heihei waʻa	

== Others ==
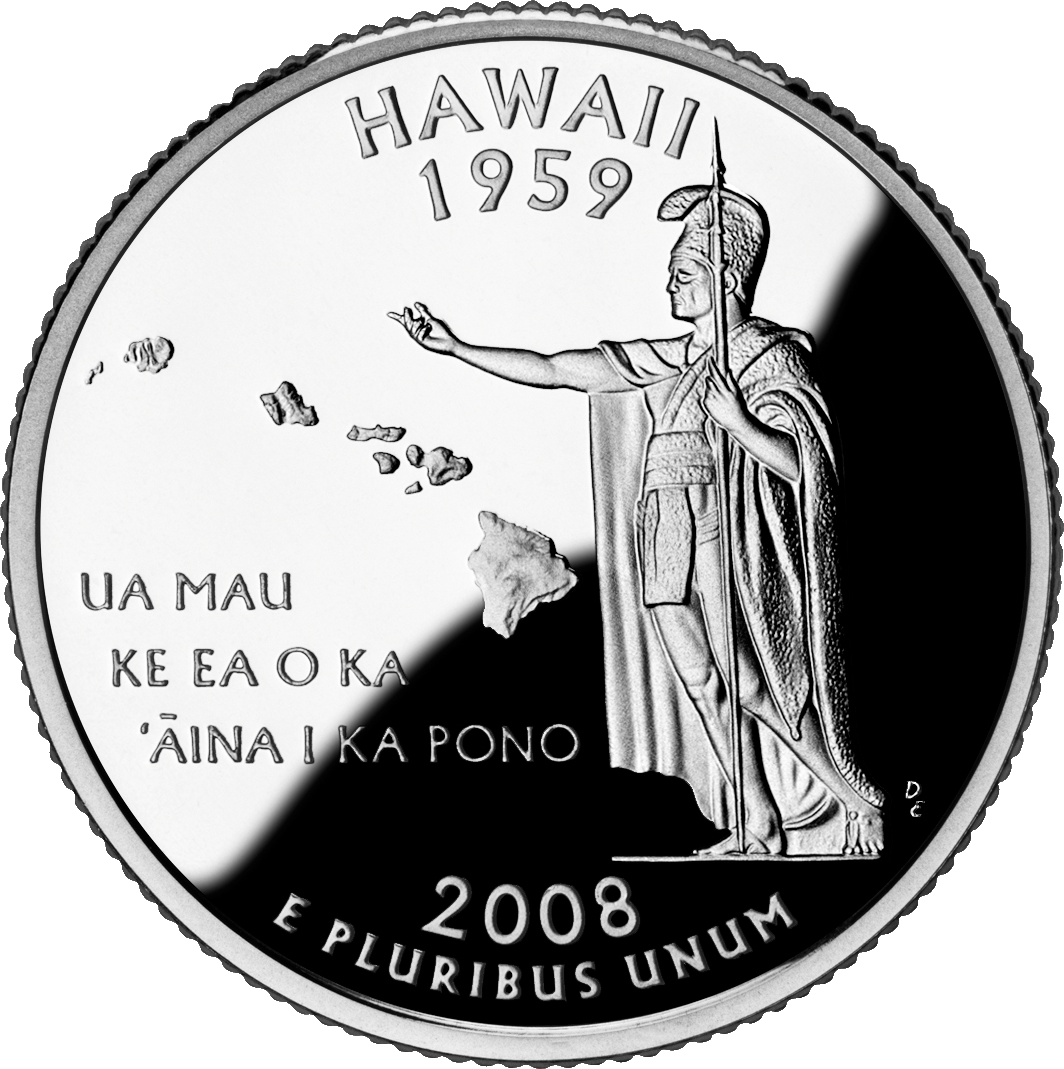
State quarter for Hawaiʻi

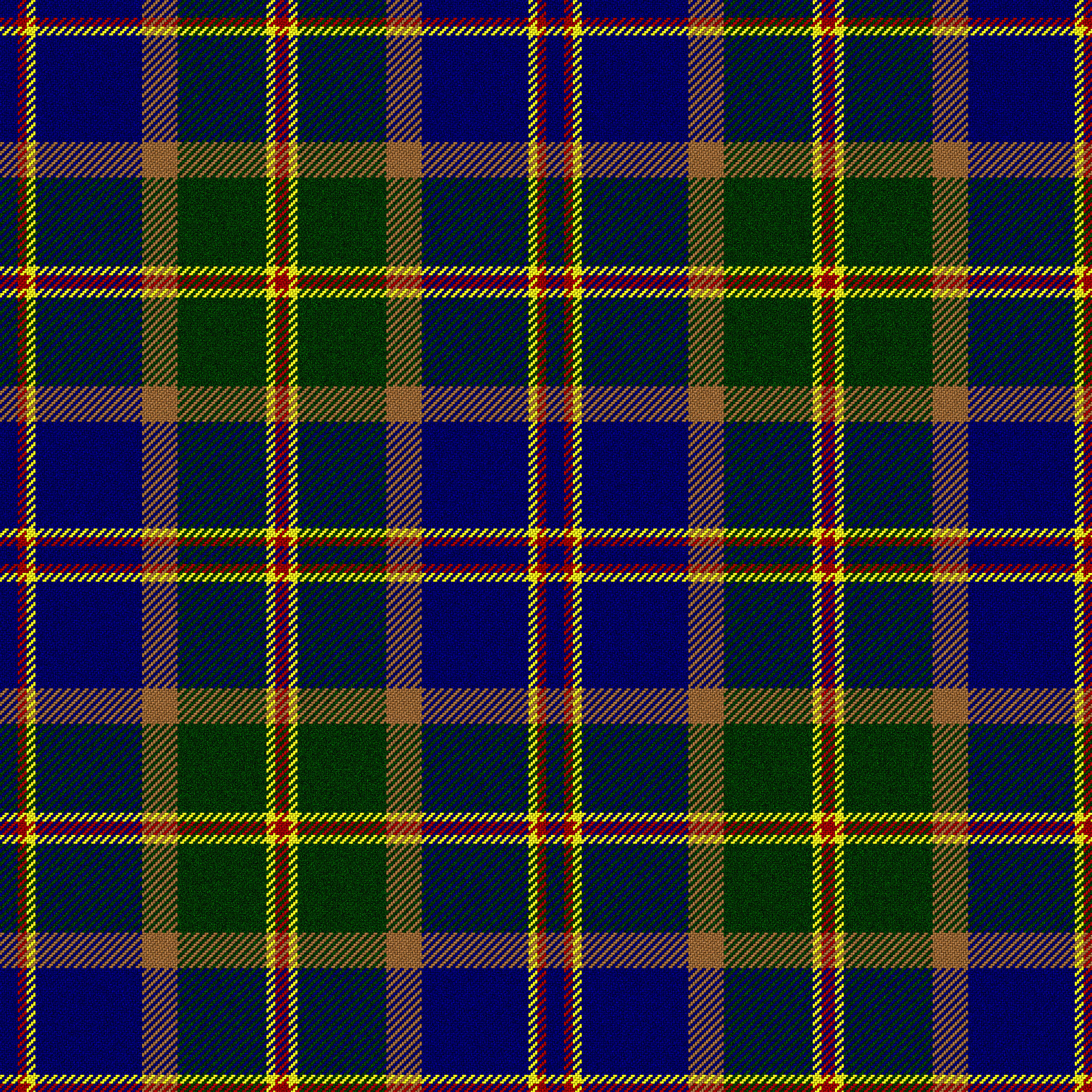
State tartan for Hawaiʻi (unofficial)

== Island colors and flowers or lei materials ==
Island	Color	Flower or lei material	Image
Hawaiʻi (Big Island)	Red	ʻŌhiʻa lehua	
Kahoʻolawe	Gray	Hinahina	
Kauaʻi	Purple	Mokihana Berry	
Lānaʻi	Orange	Kaunaʻoa	
Maui	Pink	Lokelani	
Molokaʻi	Green	Pua Kukui	
Niʻihau	White	Pūpū Shells	
Oʻahu	Yellow	Puaʻilima	
