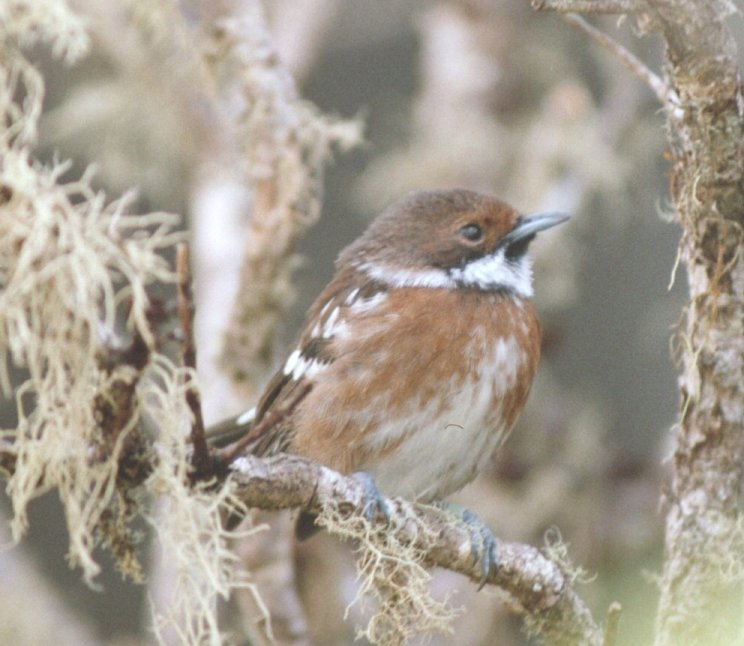
- Female volcano ʻelepaio Chasiempis sandwichensis ridgwayi

Conservation status
- Near Threatened (IUCN 3.1)

Scientific classification
- Kingdom: Animalia
- Phylum: Chordata
- Class: Aves
- Order: Passeriformes
- Family: Monarchidae
- Genus: Chasiempis
- Species: C. sandwichensis

Binomial name
- Chasiempis sandwichensis (Gmelin, JF, 1789)

Subspecies
- See text

Synonyms
- Muscicapa sandwichensis

= Hawaiʻi ʻelepaio =

Species of bird

The Hawaiʻi ʻelepaio (Chasiempis sandwichensis), also Hawaiian ʻelepaio, is a monarch flycatcher found on the Big Island of Hawaii. Until 2010, all three ʻelepaio species, the Kauaʻi ʻelepaio (Chasiempis sclateri), the Oʻahu ʻelepaio (Chasiempis ibidis) and this species were considered conspecific.

== Taxonomy and systematics ==
The Hawaiʻi ʻelepaio was formally described in 1789 by the German naturalist Johann Friedrich Gmelin in his revised and expanded edition of Carl Linnaeus's Systema Naturae. He placed it with the flycatchers in the genus Muscicapa and coined the binomial name Muscicapa sandwichensis. Gmelin based his description on the "sandwich flycatcher" that had been described in 1783 by the English ornithologist John Latham in his book A General Synopsis of Birds. Latham had examined a specimen from the Sandwich Islands (now the Hawaiian Islands) in the collection of the naturalist Joseph Banks. The specimen would have been collected between 17 January and 22 February 1779 near Kealakekua Bay on the island of Hawaii during James Cook's third voyage to the Pacific Ocean. The Hawaiʻi ʻelepaio is now placed in the genus Chasiempis that was introduced in 1847 by the German ornithologist Jean Cabanis. The species was formerly considered to be conspecific with the Kauaʻi ʻelepaio (Chasiempis sclateri) and the Oʻahu ʻelepaio (Chasiempis ibidis). The genus name is derived from Ancient Greek khaskō meaning "to gape" and empis meaning "mosquito" or "gnat".

=== Subspecies ===
Three subspecies are recognised which differ in their ecological requirements and head coloration (see also Gloger's Rule):

- C. s. sandwichensis - (Gmelin, 1789): The Kona ʻelepaio. It differs from the volcano subspecies by having the forehead and the supercilium whitish with some rusty feathers. It inhabits mesic forest characterized by koa (Acacia koa) and ʻōhiʻa lehua (Metrosideros polymorpha); its population seems to be stable at about 60,000–65,000.
- C. s. ridgwayi - Stejneger, 1887: The volcano ʻelepaio. Originally described as a separate species. This is the most common subspecies today, with a population of around 100,000–150,000, or more than half of the total number of ʻelepaio. It is a bird of the rainforest, which on Hawaiʻi are characterized by ʻōhiʻa lehua and hāpuʻu (Cibotium tree ferns).
- C. s. bryani - Pratt, 1979: The Mauna Kea ʻelepaio. It is only found in the māmane (Sophora chrysophylla ) – naio (Myoporum sandwicense) dry forest on the leeward slopes of Mauna Kea. It has the entire head heavily washed with white. Due to destruction of most of its habitat, it is the rarest Big Island subspecies, with a population of 2,000–2,500 birds.
