= Succinea flexilis =

Scientific classification
- Kingdom: Animalia
- Phylum: Mollusca
- Class: Gastropoda
- Order: Stylommatophora
- Family: Succineidae
- Genus: Succinea
- Species: S. flexilis

Binomial name
- Succinea flexilis Quick, 1957

Species of gastropod

Succinea flexilis is a species of air-breathing land snail, a terrestrial pulmonate gastropod mollusc in the family Succineidae, commonly known as the amber snails.

== Distribution ==
This species is endemic to Gough Island, which is a part of Tristan da Cunha. It is found in elevations of up to 685 metres (2,250 ft).

== Description ==
The shell has an average length of around 7 to 9 mm, and a breadth of around 3.5 to 4.5 mm.

== Habitat ==
This species mostly occurs in tussock grass and on the ground in many different places on the island.
