= Succinea concordialis =

Scientific classification
- Kingdom: Animalia
- Phylum: Mollusca
- Class: Gastropoda
- Order: Stylommatophora
- Family: Succineidae
- Genus: Succinea
- Species: S. concordialis

Binomial name
- Succinea concordialis I. Lea, 1864

Synonyms
- Succinea forsheyi I. Lea, 1864; Succinea haleana I. Lea, 1864 (junior synonym); Succinea halei "I. Lea, 1866" (incorrect subsequent spelling of...); Succinea munita A. Gould, 1851; Succinea witteri Shimek, 1913; Succinea concordialis Gould, 1848 (partim.) Synonyms of Succinea concordialis according to Pilsbry (1939): Succinea munita Binney, 1851; Succinea forshei Lea, 1864; Succinea haleana Lea, 1864; Succinea halei Lea; Succinea witteri Shimek, 1913

Species of gastropod

Succinea concordialis, common name the spotted ambersnail, is a species of small, air-breathing, land snail, a terrestrial pulmonate gastropod mollusc in the family Succineidae, the amber snails.

Succinea concordialis is partially synonymous to Succinea forsheyi according to Hubrich (1985).

== Original description of Succinea concordialis ==
Succinea concordialis was originally discovered and described by Augustus Addison Gould in Latin language in 1848.

Gould's original text (the type description) reads as follows:

SUCCINEA CONCORDIALIS. Testâ tenui, lucidâ, obliquè ovatâ,

acuminatâ, reflexâ, cereâ et ad apicem rubicundâ, leviter striatâ et lineis obscuris volventibus insculptâ; anfr. 3 perobliquis, supernis parvulis, tumidis, suturâ profunda; aperturâ ovatâ, trientes duæ longitudinis testæ æquante, basi rotundatâ; columellâ arcuatâ, absque plicâ, leviter arrectâ; intus micante. Long ½, lat. ⅓ poll. Hab. near Lake Concordia.

At first view, this might be mistaken for Limnea columella. Its color and texture are like S. amphibia, from which it differs chiefly in the slight upturning of the edge of the columellar lip,

the presence of the obscure revolving lines and the ruddy apex.

== Distribution ==
This species occurs in the US, in these States: Alabama, Arkansas, Florida, Illinois, Iowa, Kansas, Kentucky, Louisiana, Missouri, Nebraska, New Mexico, North Carolina, Oklahoma, Tennessee, Texas and Wisconsin.
