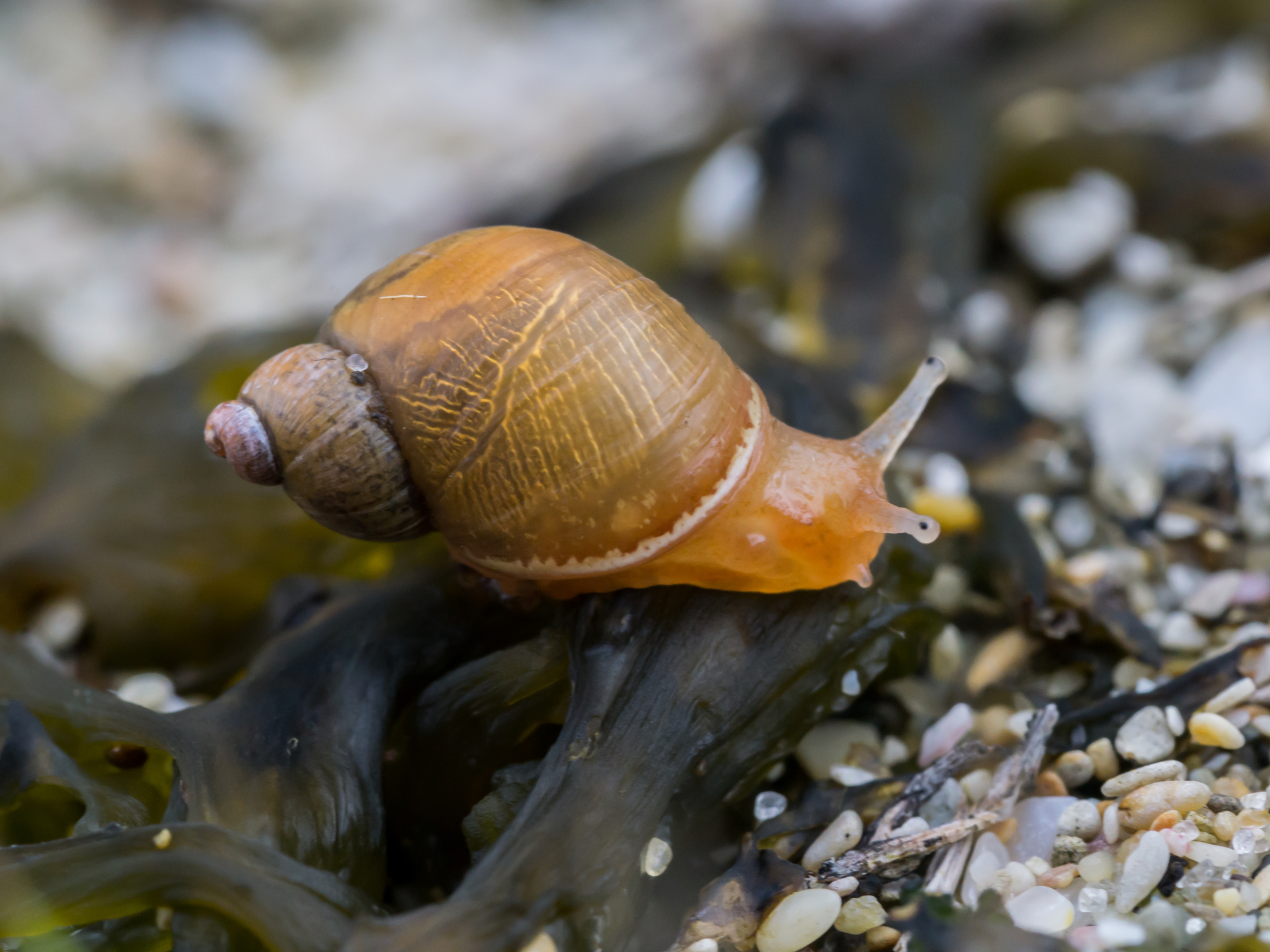

Scientific classification
- Kingdom: Animalia
- Phylum: Mollusca
- Class: Gastropoda
- Order: Stylommatophora
- Family: Succineidae
- Genus: Succinea
- Species: S. archeyi

Binomial name
- Succinea archeyi Powell, 1933

= Succinea archeyi =

Species of gastropod

Succinea archeyi is a species of small, air-breathing land snail, a terrestrial pulmonate gastropod mollusc in the family Succineidae, the amber snails.
