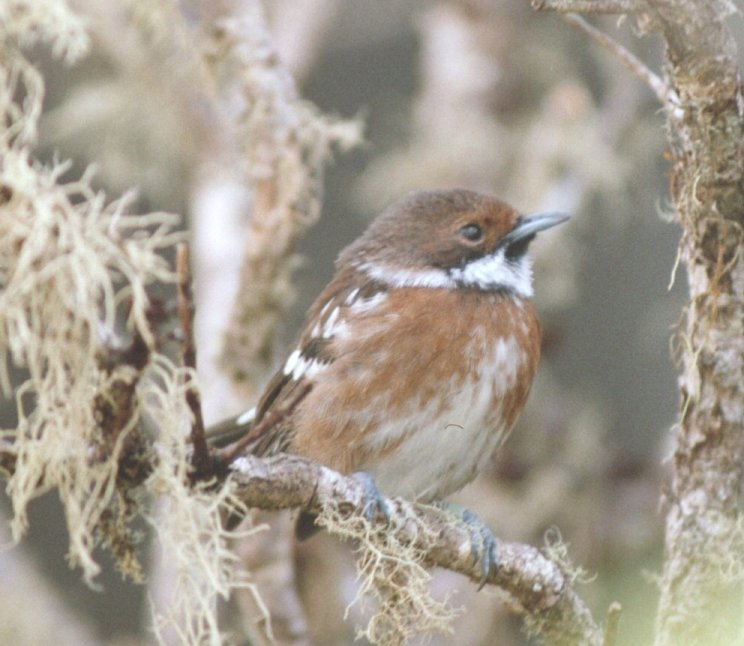
- Female volcano ʻelepaio Chasiempis sandwichensis ridgwayi

Scientific classification
- Kingdom: Animalia
- Phylum: Chordata
- Class: Aves
- Order: Passeriformes
- Family: Monarchidae
- Genus: Chasiempis; Cabanis, 1847

Type species
- Muscicapa sandwichensis Gmelin, 1789

Species
- C. sclateri; C. ibidis; C. sandwichensis

= ʻElepaio =

Genus of birds

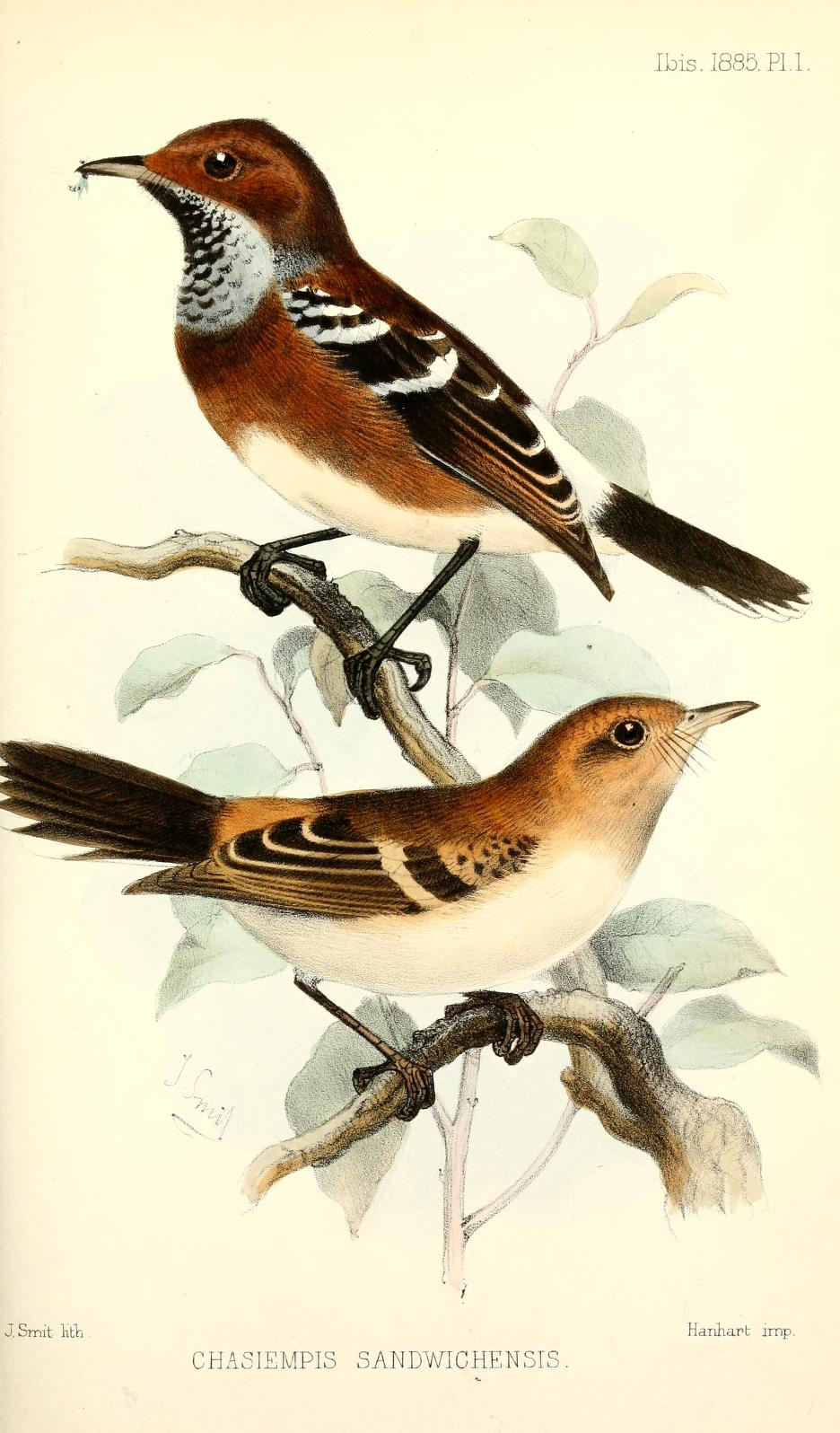
Illustration by Joseph Smit

The ʻelepaio are three species of monarch flycatcher in the genus Chasiempis. They are endemic to the Hawaiian Islands, and were formerly considered conspecific. They measure 14 cm long and weigh 12–18 g. One species inhabits the Big Island, another Oʻahu and the third Kauaʻi. Being one of the most adaptable native birds of Hawaiʻi, no subspecies have yet become extinct, though two have become quite rare.

The ʻelepaio is the first native bird to sing in the morning and the last to stop singing at night; apart from whistled and chattering contact and alarm calls, it is probably best known for its song, from which derives the common name: a pleasant and rather loud warble which sounds like e-le-PAI-o or ele-PAI-o. It nests between January and June.

== Species ==
The genus Chasiempis contains three species:

| Image | Scientific name | Common name | Distribution |
|---|---|---|---|
| | Chasiempis sclateri | Kauaʻi ʻelepaio | Hawaiian Island of Kauaʻi |
| | Chasiempis ibidis | Oʻahu ʻelepaio | Hawaiian Island of Oʻahu. |
| | Chasiempis sandwichensis | Hawaiʻi ʻelepaio | Hawaiian Island of Hawaiʻi. |

== Distribution ==
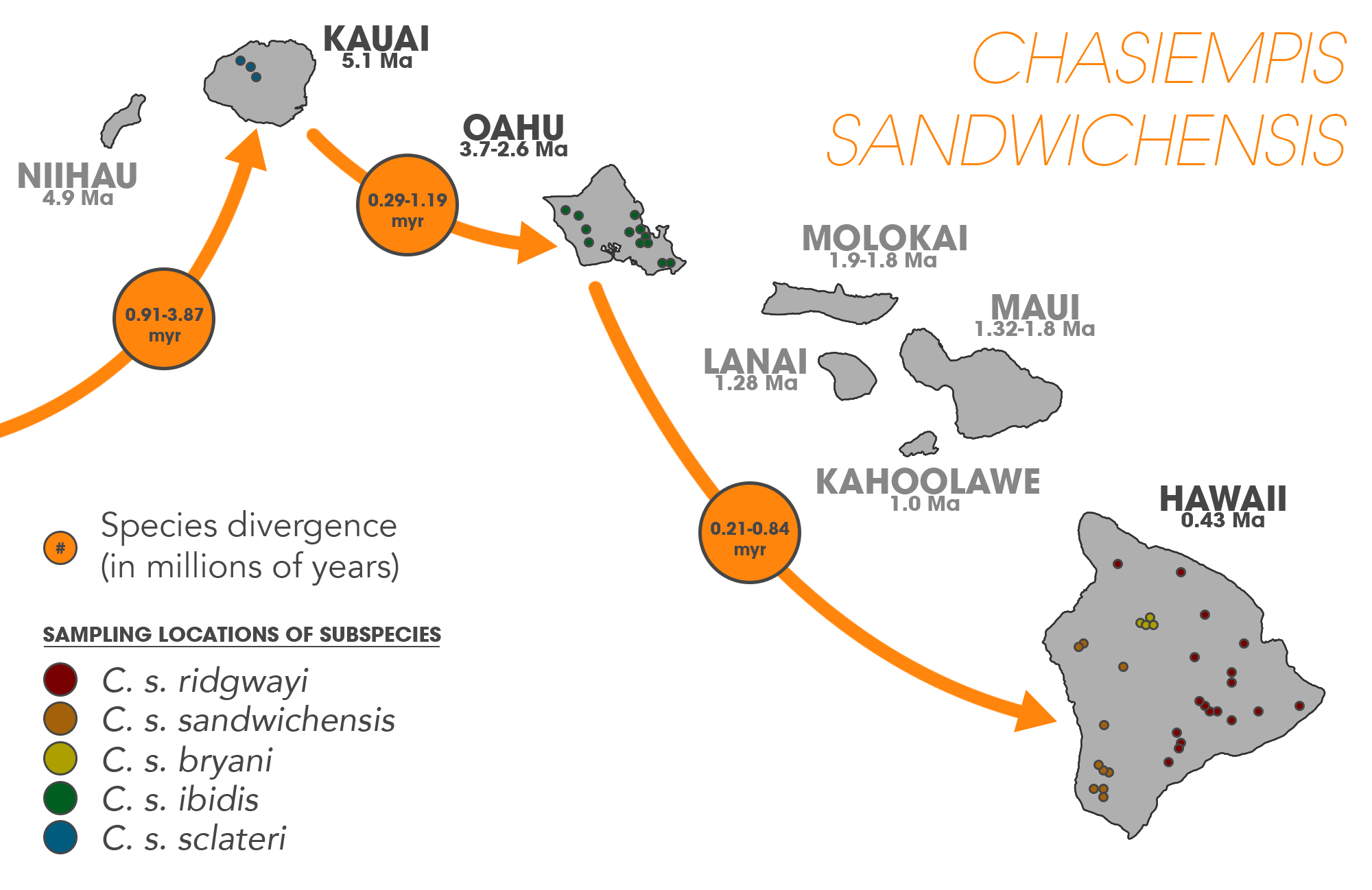
The sequential colonization and speciation of the Chasiempis sandwichensis subspecies (denoted by the orange arrows) with their divergence times and island geological ages.

Uniquely among Hawaiian passerines, the distribution of the ʻelepaio is peculiarly discontinuous. According to fossil remains, the birds did not occur on Maui Nui or its successor islands. Their current distribution is absent from the Maui Nui island group. If this assumption is correct, the reasons are unknown at present. However, the strange "flycatcher finches", extinct honeycreepers of the genus Vangulifer, are only known to have inhabited Maui and probably evolved on Maui Nui. There, they probably filled the same ecological niche as the ʻelepaio did on the other islands. Competition from Vangulifer may thus have prevented a successful colonization of Maui Nui by Chasiempis.

== Cultural significance ==
In Hawaiian tradition, the ʻelepaio was among the most celebrated of the birds. It is associated with a number of significant roles in culture and mythology. Chiefly, it helped kālai waʻa (canoe-builders) to select the right koa tree to use for their waʻa (canoe). The ʻelepaio is a bold and curious little bird, and thus it was attracted to humans whom it found working in its habitat, and it quickly learned to exploit feeding opportunities created by human activity, altering its behavior accordingly – which incidentally made it even more conspicuous.

For example, it followed canoe builders through dense vegetation, watching them as they searched for suitable trees. They considered it their guardian spirit, an incarnation of their patron goddess Lea, because if the bird pecked at a fallen tree, it was a sign that the tree was riddled with burrowing insects and thus not good anymore, but when the bird showed no interest in a tree, it indicated that the wood was suitable. This is the origin of the ancient Hawaiian proverb, Ua ʻelepaio ʻia ka waʻa ("The canoe is marked out by the ʻelepaio"). Due to its insectivorous habit, farmers believed the ʻelepaio to be the incarnation of Lea's sister goddess, Hina-puku-ʻai, who protected food plants and was a patron of agriculture.

== Status ==
Although deforestation for agriculture destroyed large areas of habitat, the ʻelepaio managed to adapt well to the initial settlement. Thus, its population was large enough to withstand the additional pressures that came about with Western colonization of the islands. However, the Oʻahu species has declined precipitously in recent years and is now endangered.
