= Clarkia lingulata =

Conservation status
- Critically Imperiled (NatureServe)

Scientific classification
- Kingdom: Plantae
- Clade: Tracheophytes
- Clade: Angiosperms
- Clade: Eudicots
- Clade: Rosids
- Order: Myrtales
- Family: Onagraceae
- Genus: Clarkia
- Species: C. lingulata

Binomial name
- Clarkia lingulata H. F. Lewis & M. E. Lewis

Species of flowering plant

Clarkia lingulata is a rare species of wildflower known by the common name Merced clarkia. This plant is endemic to Mariposa County, California, where it is known from only two sites near the Merced River.

It is thought to have evolved very rapidly, outside the usual model of allopatric speciation, from its parental species Clarkia biloba.

It is a state-listed endangered species in California.

== Description ==
Clarkia lingulata erects a spindly stem rarely exceeding 0.5 metres (1.6 ft) in height and bearing sparse narrow leaves.

The saucer-shaped flowers have four bright pink spoon-shaped petals 1 to 2 centimeters long and sometimes flecked with red. There are eight stamens with lavender anthers.
