= Succinea caduca =

Conservation status
- Vulnerable (NatureServe)

Scientific classification
- Kingdom: Animalia
- Phylum: Mollusca
- Class: Gastropoda
- Order: Stylommatophora
- Family: Succineidae
- Genus: Succinea
- Species: S. caduca

Binomial name
- Succinea caduca (Mighels, 1845)

Species of land snail

Succinea caduca is a species of land snail native to Hawai'i.

== Taxonomy ==
Succinea caduca is a species of clade B of succineid species on Hawai'i, as identified using nuclear DNA and mitochondrial DNA markers. The clade (and thus, this species) arose in an evolutionary radiation relatively more recent than the other clade of succineids, clade A.

== Description ==
Succinea caduca has an approximately oval-shaped, fragile shell, about a third of an inch in length and a fifth of an inch in breadth. This shell has about two and a half whorls with a prominent spire, and is "horn color".

== Distribution ==
Succinea caduca was first described as inhabiting the island O'ahu in 1848, but have since been found to inhabit six Hawaiian islands (O'ahu, Lāna'i, Mokoka'i, Kaua'i, Maui, and Hawai'i) in a field survey conducted from 2004–2005. They are the only species in clade B of succineid species to inhabit more than one island. They live at the coast, and are commonly seen in coastal gullies after heavy rain. An experiment found that they could survive 12 hours of immersion in sea water, indicating they may have been able to move between islands by riding on materials drifting in the water. S. caduca inhabits relatively arid habitats.

== Habitat ==
Succinea caduca tend to be found under overhangs, in cracks in vertical lava rock, in leaf litter, and in dense grass. S. caduca also inhabits anthropogenic areas, such that have introduced, nonnative plants and disturbance from urban development. S. caduca prefers dry areas.

== Conservation status ==
Succinea caduca is one of the few land snail species on Hawai'i that is nonendangered, as well as inhabiting multiple islands. A possible explanation for this is its distribution in dry areas, which may only partially overlap with the distribution of Euglandina rosea, a predator snail species that was introduced to Hawai'i and is a major contributor to native Hawaiian land snail species declining.
