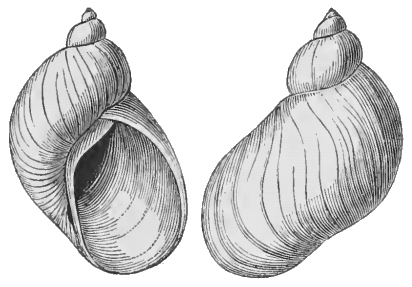
- Shells of Succinea antiqua

Scientific classification
- Kingdom: Animalia
- Phylum: Mollusca
- Class: Gastropoda
- Order: Stylommatophora
- Family: Succineidae
- Genus: Succinea
- Species: †S. antiqua

Binomial name
- †Succinea antiqua Colbeau, 1867

= Succinea antiqua =

Extinct species of gastropod

Succinea antiqua is an extinct species of small, air-breathing land snail, a terrestrial pulmonate gastropod mollusc in the family Succineidae, the amber snails.
