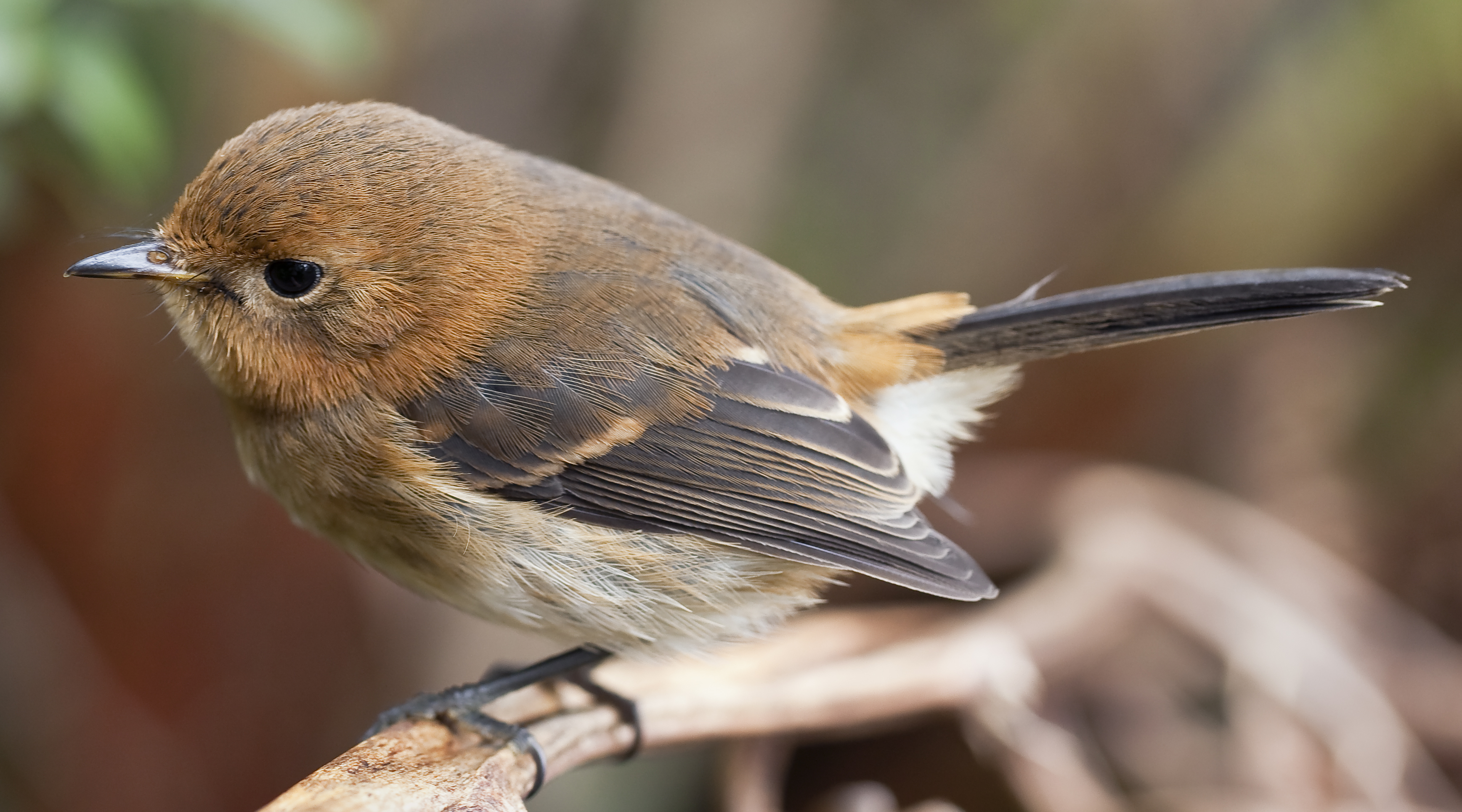

Conservation status
- Near Threatened (IUCN 3.1)

Scientific classification
- Kingdom: Animalia
- Phylum: Chordata
- Class: Aves
- Order: Passeriformes
- Family: Monarchidae
- Genus: Chasiempis
- Species: C. sclateri

Binomial name
- Chasiempis sclateri Ridgway, 1882

Synonyms
- Chasiempis sandwichensis sclateri

= Kauaʻi ʻelepaio =

Species of bird

The Kauaʻi ʻelepaio (Chasiempis sclateri) is a monarch flycatcher found on the Hawaiian Island of Kauaʻi. It numbered 40,000 around 1970, but declined by half in the 1990s. Whether this fluctuation is natural and thus the birds' numbers will rebound or whether it signifies a novel threat remains to be seen. However, it seems the birds are making a recovery, as population density on the Alakai plateau has increased by 13% in recent years.

== Taxonomy and systematics ==
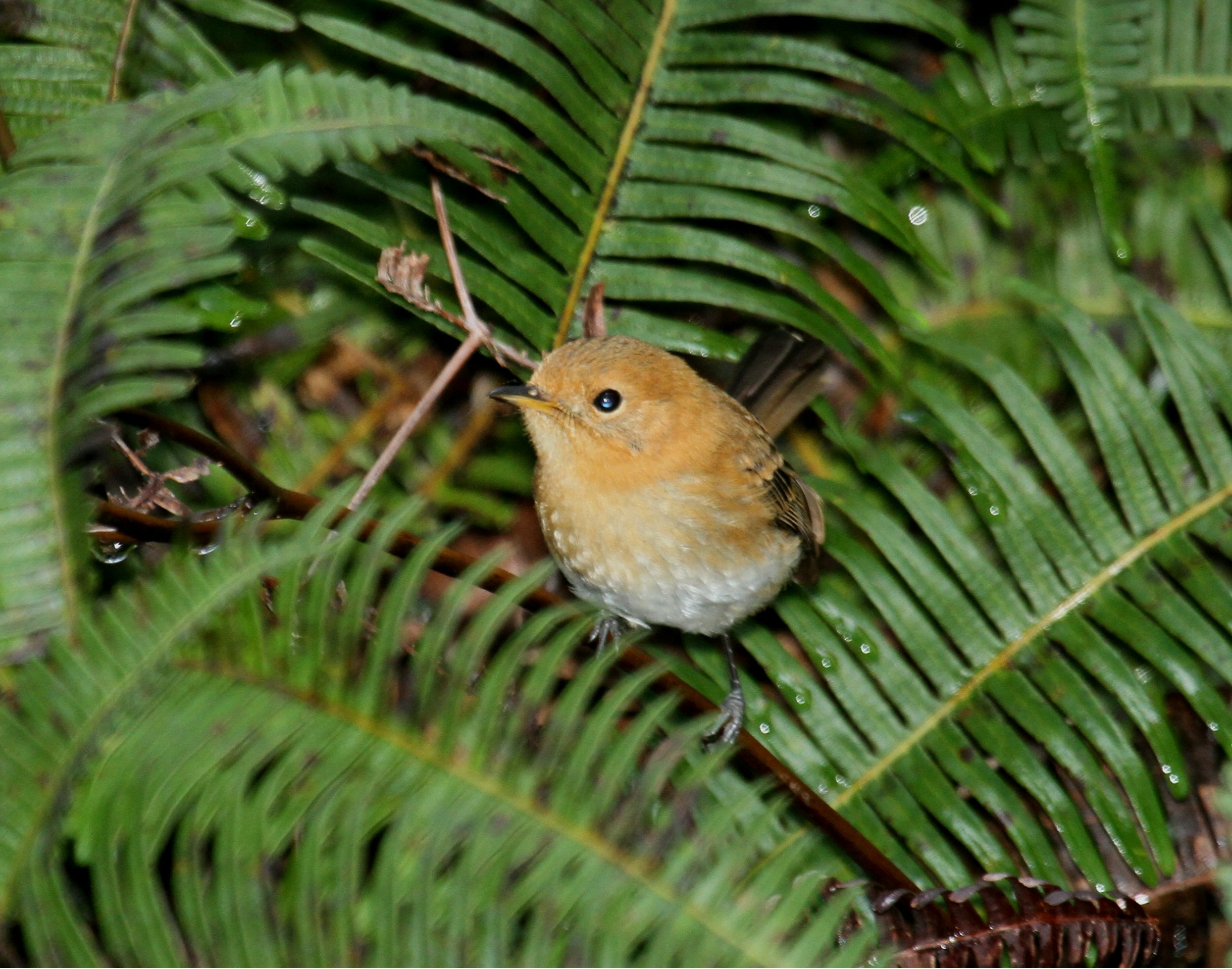
Alakai Wilderness – Kauaʻi, Hawaii (flash photo)

The Kauaʻi ʻelepaio was formerly considered as a subspecies of the Hawaii ʻelepaio (Chasiempis sandwichensis sclateri) until reclassified as a separate species in 2010.

== Description ==
This is the most distinct ʻelepaio; adult birds have their head and back gray, with a white supercilium, a rusty-red breast and a white underside. Young birds are uniformly rusty above and white below. Wings and tail are alike in all subspecies, but the young individuals of sclateri have the white stippling of the wings replaced by rusty coloration too.
