= Godetia =

Godetia may refer to one of several wildflowers native to the western United States:

- Clarkia amoena
- Clarkia bottae

== Warships ==
- HMS Godetia (K226)
- HMS Godetia (1916)
- Belgian ship Godetia

== Other uses ==
- Godetia (horse), Irish-trained thoroughbred racehorse active 1978-1980
