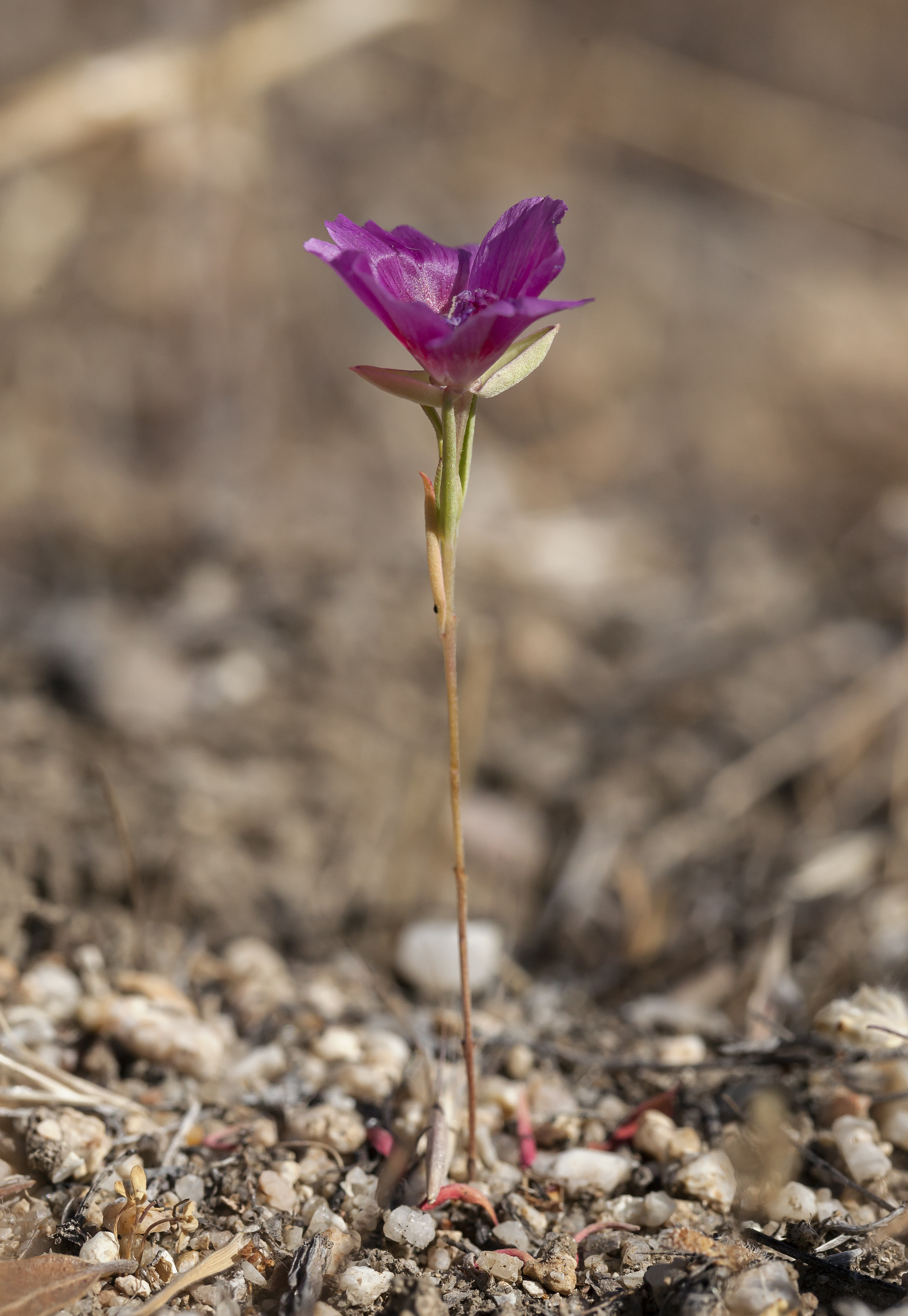

Conservation status
- Imperiled (NatureServe)

Scientific classification
- Kingdom: Plantae
- Clade: Tracheophytes
- Clade: Angiosperms
- Clade: Eudicots
- Clade: Rosids
- Order: Myrtales
- Family: Onagraceae
- Genus: Clarkia
- Species: C. jolonensis

Binomial name
- Clarkia jolonensis D.R.Parn.

= Clarkia jolonensis =

Species of flowering plant

Clarkia jolonensis is an uncommon species of flowering plant in the evening primrose family known by the common name Jolon clarkia. It is endemic to Monterey County, California, where it is known from the woodlands of the Central Coast Ranges.

== Description ==
This is an erect annual herb growing a hairless, waxy stem up to about half a meter in maximum height. The leaves are lance-shaped and a few centimeters long. The top of the stem is occupied by an erect inflorescence with opening flowers below an erect array of closed, hanging flower buds. The sepals of the bud remain fused as it opens into a bloom. The fan-shaped lavender petals are often flecked with red and tinted with pink, each measuring one or two centimeters long. There are 8 stamens, some of which have large lavender anthers, and some bearing smaller, paler anthers.

This plant is very similar to, and historically confused with, Clarkia lewisii, which differs from C. jolonensis in that the former has a curved inflorescence with closely packed nodding flower buds, while the latter has an erect, widely spaced inflorescence. Some of the few known occurrences of this plant may actually be its sister species, making it rarer than officially listed.
