= Xantus =

Xanthus at refer to :

- Xanthus, Lycia, an Ancient city and bishopric, now Gunik in Anatolia (Asian Turkey) and a Latin Catholic titular see
- János Xántus = John Xantus de Vesey a.k.a. de Csíktaplócza, a Hungarian exile and zoologist
