= John Xantus =

Hungarian zoologist

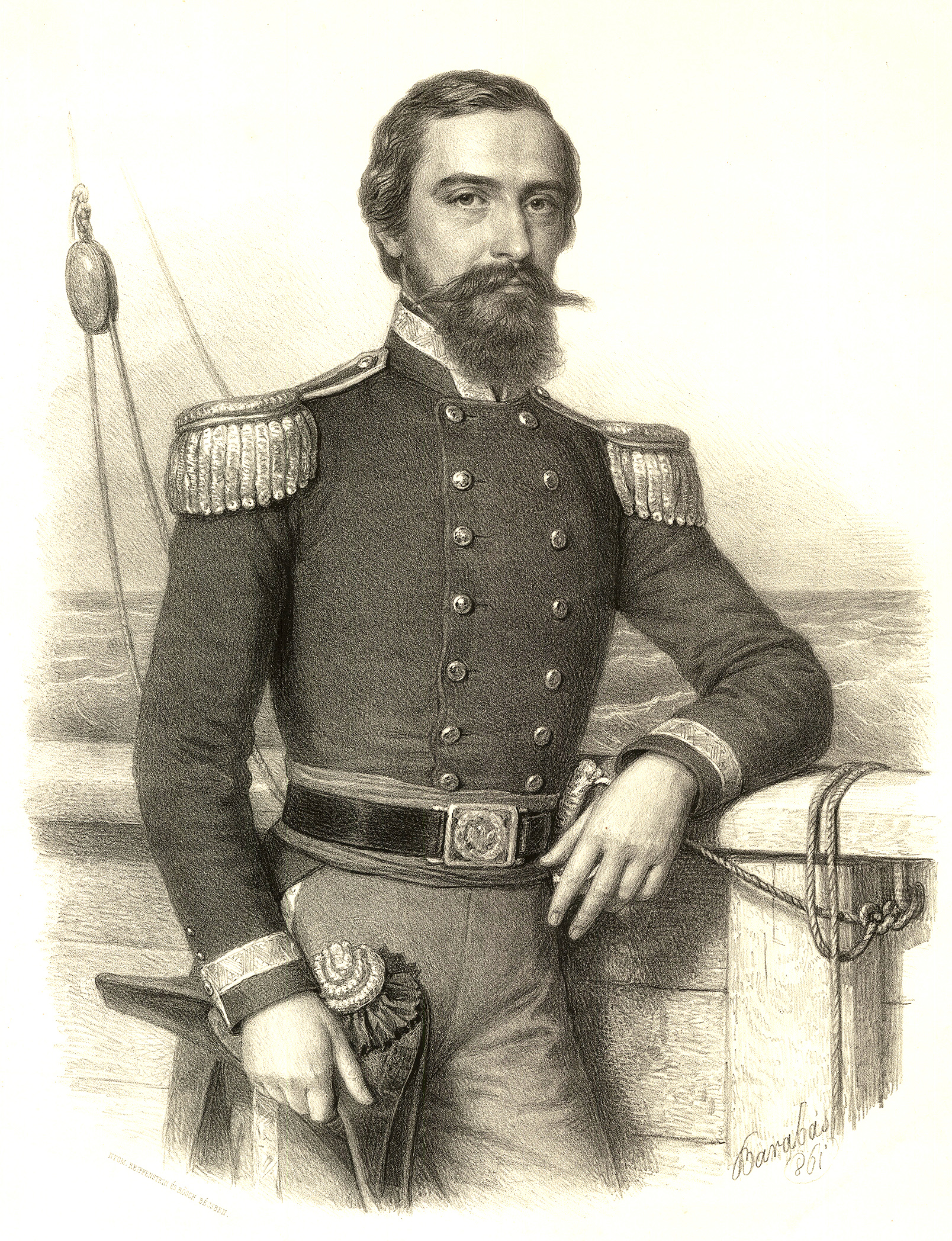
- Portrait of John Xantus by Miklós Barabás (1861)
- Born: Xántus János; 5 October 1825; Csokonyavisonta, Somogy, Hungary
- Died: 13 December 1894 (aged 69); Budapest
- Scientific career
- Fields: Soldier, zoologist, various others
- Workplaces: Zoological Garden of Budapest, Hungarian National Museum
- Author abbrev. (zoology): Xantus

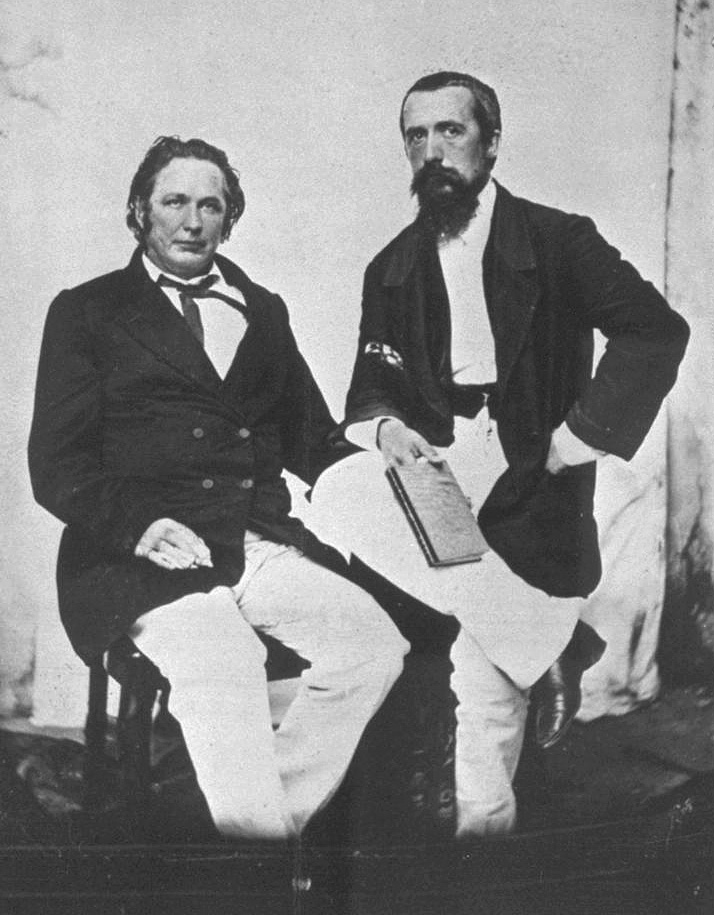
John Xantus (right) with Andrew Jackson Grayson (1860s)

John Xantus de Vesey a.k.a. de Csíktaplócza (Hungarian: Csíktaplóczai (Vese) Xántus János, 5 October 1825 – 13 December 1894) was a Hungarian exile and zoologist. Xantus (the aristocratic title de Vesey was an affectation, of which he had several variations) was born Xántus János, in Csokonya, Somogy, Hungary.

Trained as a lawyer, he served as an officer in the nationalist uprisings of 1848–1849 in the Hungarian Army. Captured and exiled to Prague, he was arrested again, and escaped to the United States via England in 1850. In the U.S. he pursued a variety of occupations, including bookseller, druggist, a teacher, and hospital steward in the U.S. Army. In the Army he met Dr. William Alexander Hammond, a collector for the noted zoologist Spencer Fullerton Baird.

Working under Hammond as an assistant surgeon, he soon developed an interest in natural history and became a gifted collector himself. In 1860 he was stationed as a tidal observer at Cabo San Lucas, on the southern tip of the Baja California peninsula, where he collected natural history specimens for the United States National Museum. They still have a collection originating from him. While in Baja California, he published in Hungarian an account that purported to narrate his travels and observations of native antiquities, but which in fact was plagiarized from accounts referring to other regions. He corresponded extensively with Baird, and managed to use the support of Baird and Hammond (later Surgeon General of the United States Army), getting them to write letters of recommendation on his behalf. On the basis of these he was given a consular position in Mexico, a position he promptly lost after embarrassing the Department of State by recognising a local rebelling warlord. Soon after this he returned to Hungary.

In 1869 he joined the Austro-Hungarian East Asiatic Expedition, but left it late in 1869 and spent some time in Sarawak before returning to Hungary late in 1870.

For 30 years until his death in Budapest in 1894 he served as the director of the Zoological Garden of Budapest and as curator of ethnography at the Hungarian National Museum, as well as undertaking collecting expeditions in Asia.

Several zoological and botanical taxa have been named for him:

Animals:

- Synthliboramphus hypoleucus – Xantus's murrelet [also known as Guadalepe murrelet; considered conspecific with Scripps' Murrelet until 2012]
- Hylocharis xantusii – Xantus's hummingbird
- Labrisomus xanti – largemouth blenny, rock blenny
- Halichoeres xanti – earmuff wrasse (current scientific name, Halichoeres bicolor)
- Umbrina xanti – Polla drum, golden drum, golden croaker
- Phyllodactylus xanti – Xantus' leaf-toed gecko, leaf-toed gecko
- Portunus xantusii – Xantus' swimming crab
- Xantusiidae, the night-lizards family, plus the subfamily Xantusiinae, and the genus Xantusia

Plants:

- Clarkia xantiana – Xantus' clarkia, gunsight fairyfan
- Euphorbia xanti – shrubby euphorbia
- Chaenactis xantiana – Xantus' pincushion, Mojave pincushion
- Chorizanthe xanti – Xantus' spineflower
- Polygala xanti – Xantus's milkwort
- Mimosa xanti
- Solanum xanti
