= Clarkia australis =

Conservation status
- Imperiled (NatureServe)

Scientific classification
- Kingdom: Plantae
- Clade: Tracheophytes
- Clade: Angiosperms
- Clade: Eudicots
- Clade: Rosids
- Order: Myrtales
- Family: Onagraceae
- Genus: Clarkia
- Species: C. australis

Binomial name
- Clarkia australis E.Small

Species of flowering plant

Clarkia australis is a species of flowering plant in the evening primrose family known by the common name Small's southern clarkia. It is endemic to California, where it grows in the forests of the central Sierra Nevada. It is an uncommon species threatened by such forest activities as logging. This annual herb produces a slender, erect stem approaching a meter in height. The leaves are widely linear in shape and borne on short petioles. The top of the stem is occupied by the tall inflorescence, which bears hanging buds that open from the lowest upward so that there are several closed buds above open flowers. The sepals do not remain fused as the flower opens. The petals are diamond-shaped and sometimes lobed and curling at the tip. They are mottled or spotted lavender, purple, and reddish in color, and each is up to 1.5 centimeters long. There are 8 long stamens tipped with large anthers bearing blue-gray pollen. The stigma protrudes past the anthers.

This species of Clarkia is very closely related to Clarkia virgata, and it has been suggested that it is not actually a separate species, but hybridization studies have demonstrated that there has been sufficient reproductive isolation to produce hybrid incompatibility between the two taxa, confirming that they should be treated as separate species.
