= Belgian ship Godetia =

Belgian auxiliary ship

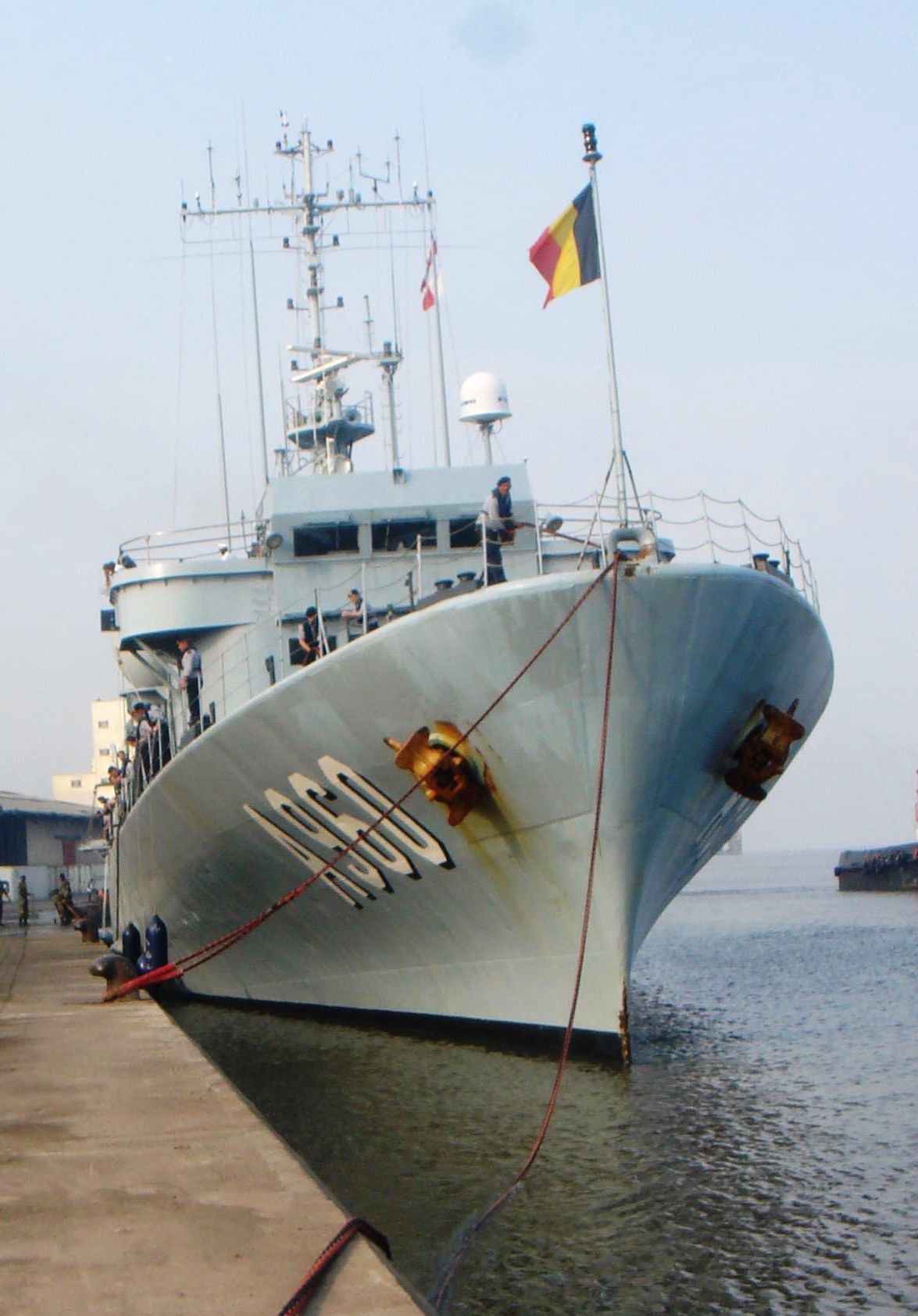
- Godetia

History

Belgium
- Name: Godetia
- Builder: Boelwerf, Temse
- Laid down: 15 February 1965
- Launched: 7 December 1965
- Commissioned: 2 June 1966
- Decommissioned: 26 June 2021
- Home port: Zeebrugge Naval Base
- Identification: Pennant number: A 960; MMSI number: 205204000; Callsign: ORJH
- Fate: Scrapped

General characteristics
- Type: Command and logistical support ship
- Displacement: 2,000 t (2,000 long tons) standard; 2,500 t (2,500 long tons) fully loaded
- Length: 91.83 m (301 ft 3 in)
- Beam: 14.00 m (45 ft 11 in)
- Draught: 3.50 m (11 ft 6 in)
- Installed power: 4 × ACEC-MAN diesel engines, 4,000 kW (5,400 bhp)
- Propulsion: 2 × shafts, controllable pitch propellers
- Speed: 19 knots (35 km/h; 22 mph)
- Range: 6,000 nmi (11,000 km; 6,900 mi) at 15 knots (28 km/h; 17 mph)
- Complement: 96
- Armament: 6 × single 12.7 mm (0.50 in) machine guns
- Aircraft carried: 1 helicopter
- Aviation facilities: Helipad

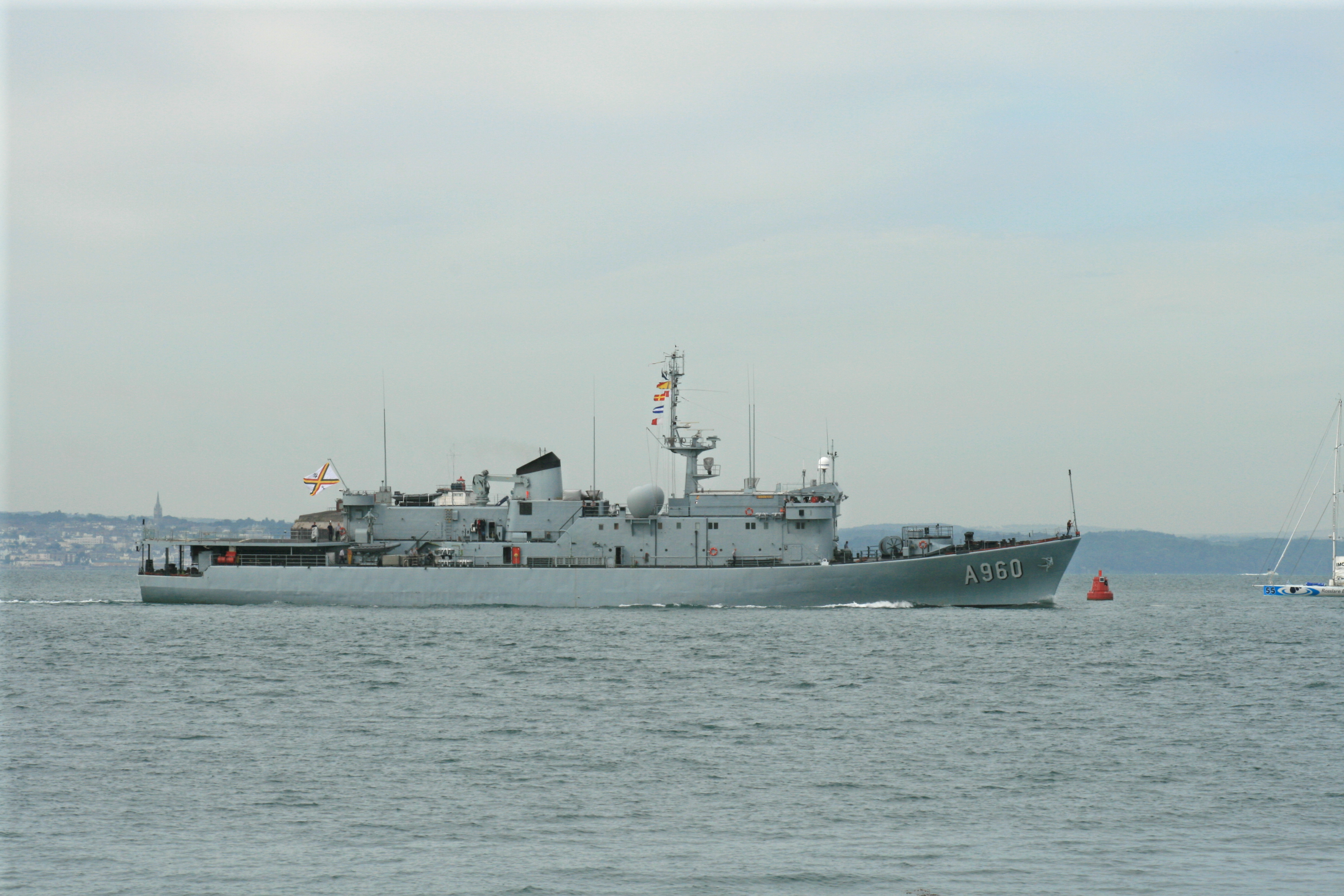
Godetia entering Portsmouth Naval Base, UK, on 9 July 2010

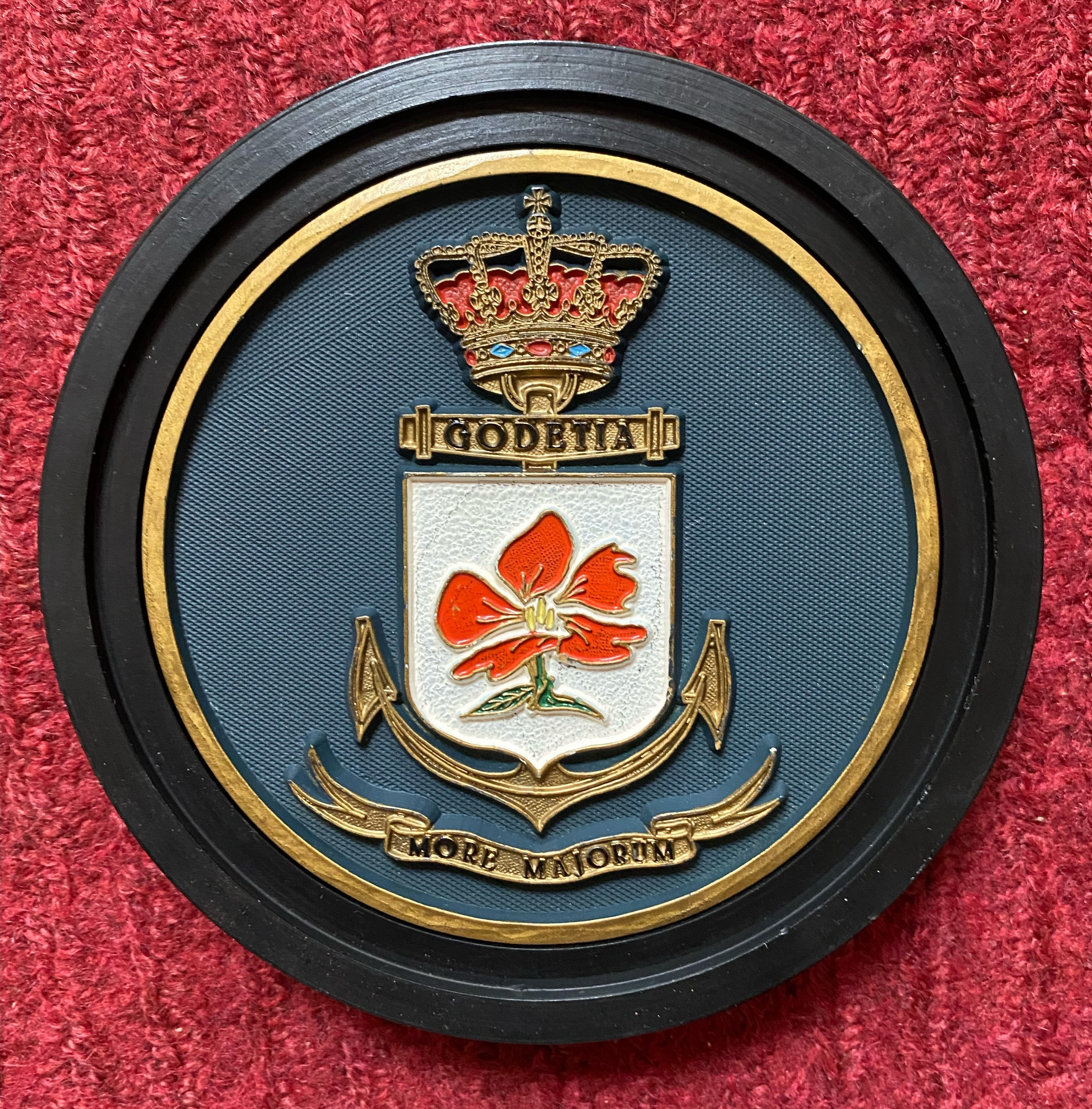
Godetia Ship Crest

Godetia (A960) was a command and logistical support ship of the Belgian Navy, launched on 7 December 1965 at the Boelwerf in Temse and entered service on 2 June 1966. The patronage of Godetia was accepted by the city of Ostend. She was the first of two support ships acquired to replace World War II-era ships. Used primarily to provide logistic support to Belgium's fleet of minesweepers, Godetia also saw service as a training ship, royal yacht and fisheries protection vessel. The vessel served with NATO's Standing NATO Mine Countermeasures Group 1 in the Baltic and North seas. In June 2021, Godetia was taken out of service. In 2021 the ship was delivered to demolition yard.

== Description ==
Godetia was designed as a command and logistical support ship and measured 92 m (301 ft) long overall and 88 metres (289 ft) at the waterline, with a beam of 14 metres (46 ft) and a draught of 3.48 metres (11 ft 5 in). The ship had a light displacement of 1,700 tonnes (1,700 long tons) and 2,300 t (2,300 long tons) at full load. The ship was powered by four ACEC-MAN diesel engines turning two shafts with controllable pitch propellers creating 4,000 kilowatts (5,400 bhp). Godetia had a maximum speed of 19 knots (35 km/h; 22 mph) and a range of 6,000 nautical miles (11,000 km; 6,900 mi) at 15 knots (28 km/h; 17 mph).

The ship was initially armed with two twin-mounted Bofors 40-millimetre (1.6 in) guns located fore and aft. Godetia had a complement of 100 with accommodation for an additional 35 personnel. The vessel has a large central hold serviced by a single crane. It was equipped with royal apartments for the monarch of Belgium. The ship has passive tank stabilisation and closed-circuit ventilation. It could accommodate oceanographic research personnel and had laboratory space.

=== Refits ===
A refit in the late 1960s saw the aft 40 mm gun mount removed and the first level of the superstructure extended aft to create a landing pad for use by a light helicopter. Furthermore, reels of minesweeping cable were placed to either side of the landing pad. A refit in 1979–1980 saw the foremost cable reel removed and replaced with a deckhouse. The remaining twin 40 mm gun mount was removed and a single 40 mm gun mount was installed along with four twin 12.7 mm (0.50 in) machine gun mounts. Godetia underwent a mid-life refit in 1981–1982 which increased the ship's displacement to 2,000 tonnes (2,000 long tons) standard and 2,500 tonnes (2,500 long tons) fully loaded. The helicopter deck was extended further aft to allow Alouette III helicopters to continue to land as the fore part of the deck was used to store minesweeping cable drums. Furthermore, a hangar was fitted in front of the landing pad and the crane was replaced. The four twin 12.7 mm mounts were removed in 1983. Six single 12.7 mm guns were later installed aboard the ship. The ship was refitted again in 2006 and 2009, with the minesweeping cables removed, a mine avoidance sonar installed. The complement changed to 8 officers, 84 enlisted personnel and up to 40 cadets.

== Construction and career ==
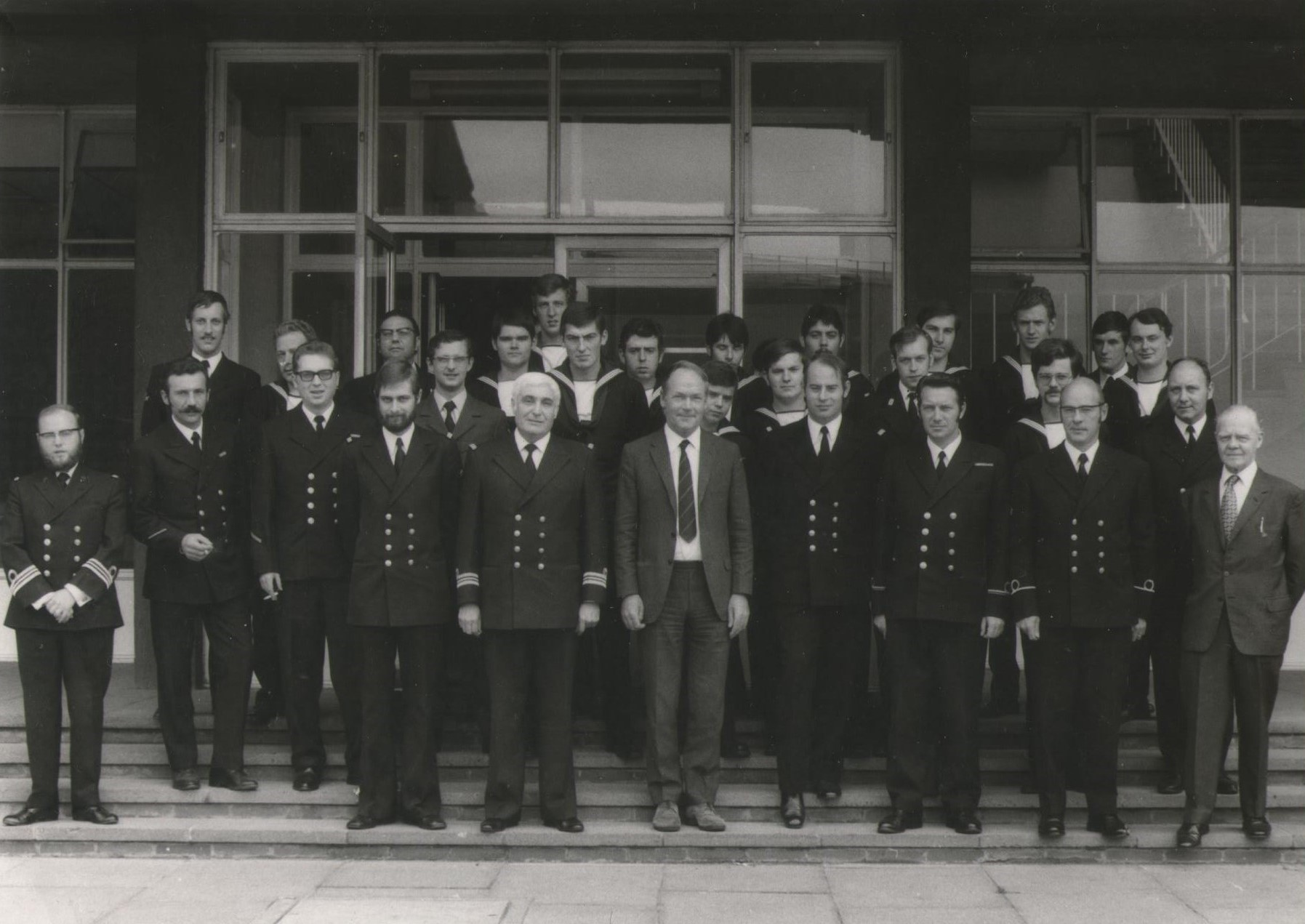
Godetia officers and crew visiting the United Kingdom (1970s–1980s)

The ship was constructed by Boelwerf in Temse, the first of two logistics ships ordered by Belgium to replace the ageing Kamina, which had transferred to the Belgian Navy after being seized after World War II from the Germans. The logistics vessel was laid down on 15 February 1965, launched on 7 December 1965 and commissioned into the Belgian Navy on 2 June 1966. Godetia is the second naval ship named for the flower operated by Belgians after HMS Godetia, a British Flower-class corvette which was crewed by Belgian sailors during World War II. The ship's main mission was to provide logistic support to Belgium and its allies' fleet of minesweepers. However, the ship was later re-designated a mine countermeasures support ship and also used for training and fisheries protection.

Godetia served with NATO's Standing NATO Mine Countermeasures Group 1 (SNMCMG1) in 2007 in the Baltic and North seas, and became the flagship of the unit in 2018. In May–June 2015 Godetia was a part of the European Union's Triton operation, enforcing the maritime border in the Mediterranean Sea. In May, the ship recovered 200 migrants from a boat adrift in the Mediterranean after the boat's engine failed. Then in June a further 103 migrants were saved from an overloaded boat and brought to Italy for care. In 2021, Godetia rejoined SNMCMG1 for a final mission before being withdrawn from service on 26 June 2021. Belgium has no plans to replace the vessel.

Godetia sailed for the last time to the shipyard for scrapping on 15 September 2021.
