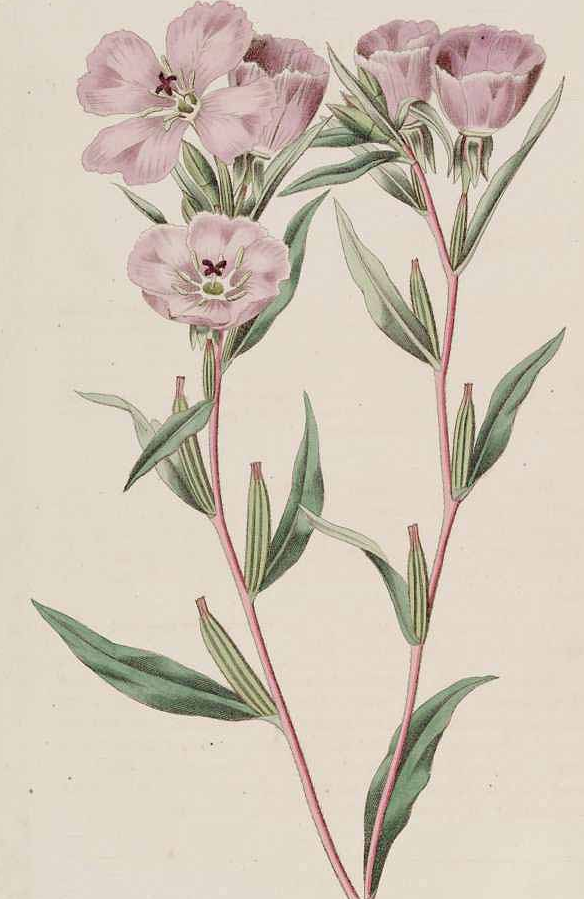
- Clarkia purpurea (artist: M. Hart)

Conservation status
- Secure (NatureServe)

Scientific classification
- Kingdom: Plantae
- Clade: Tracheophytes
- Clade: Angiosperms
- Clade: Eudicots
- Clade: Rosids
- Order: Myrtales
- Family: Onagraceae
- Genus: Clarkia
- Species: C. purpurea

Binomial name
- Clarkia purpurea (Curtis) A.Nelson & J.F.Macbr.

= Clarkia purpurea =

Species of flowering plant

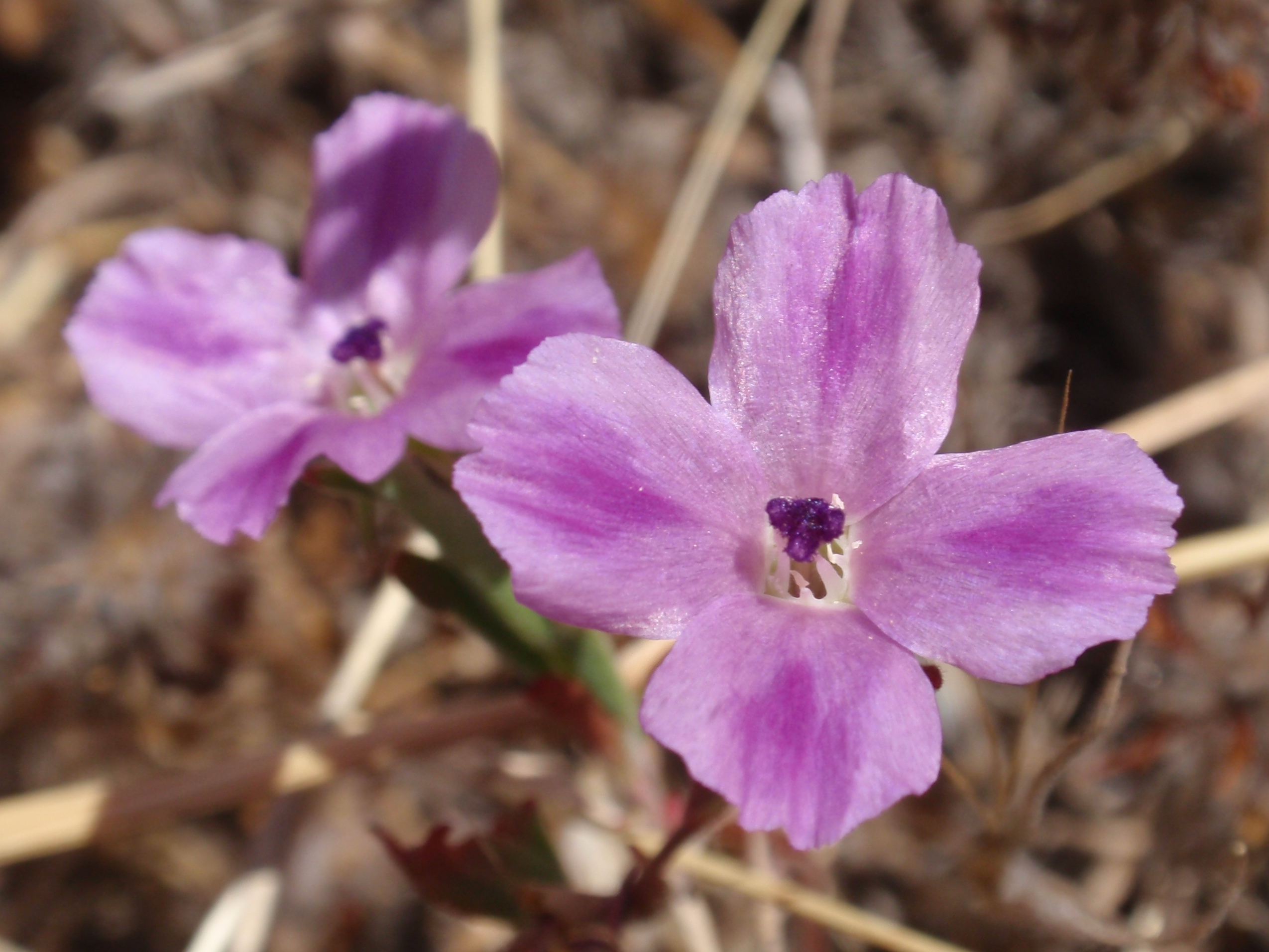
Clarkia purpurea subsp. quadrivulnera, western Mount Tamalpais, California

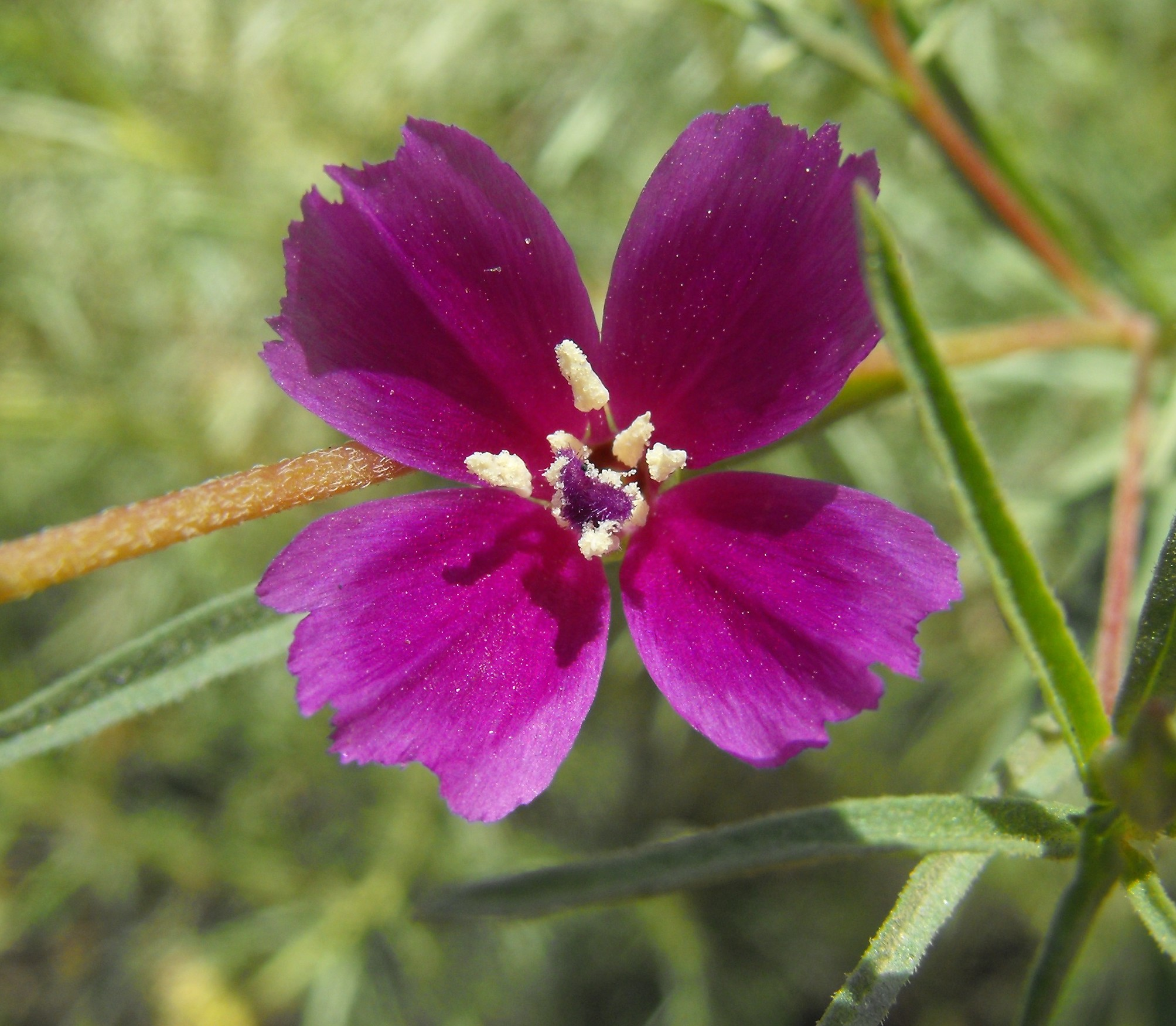
Clarkia purpurea subsp. quadrivulnera, Blue Sky Ecological Reserve, Poway, San Diego County, California

Clarkia purpurea is a species of wildflower known by the common names winecup clarkia, winecup fairy fan, and purple clarkia.

This annual plant is native to western North America, including: Baja California; California; Arizona; Oregon; Washington; and British Columbia, and is found in diverse habitats. In the California Floristic Province it is found in all the zones, except the deserts, from the coasts to high interior mountains, including the Sierra Nevada.

== Description ==
Clarkia purpurea has a thin reddish stem that may approach 1 meter (3 ft.) in height and has a few lance-shaped leaves. The bowl-shaped flowers have four petals, usually one to two centimeters long. They are in shades of pink, purple, or deep wine red; often with a streak or spot of pink or red in the middle.The fruit type is a capsule. The conspicuous flowers bloom from April to August.

=== Subspecies ===
Subspecies include:

- Clarkia purpurea ssp. purpurea
- Clarkia purpurea ssp. quadrivulnera
- Clarkia purpurea ssp. viminea

== Uses ==
The Indigenous peoples of California sowed the plant, to later harvest the seeds to grind for food.

The conspicuous flowers support native bees, making it a "honey plant".

== Taxonomy ==
Clarkia purpurea was first described in 1796 as Oenothera purpurea in Curtis's Botanical Magazine. In 1918, it was redescribed by Aven Nelson and James Francis Macbride, who put it in the genus Clarkia, as Clarkia purpurea.
