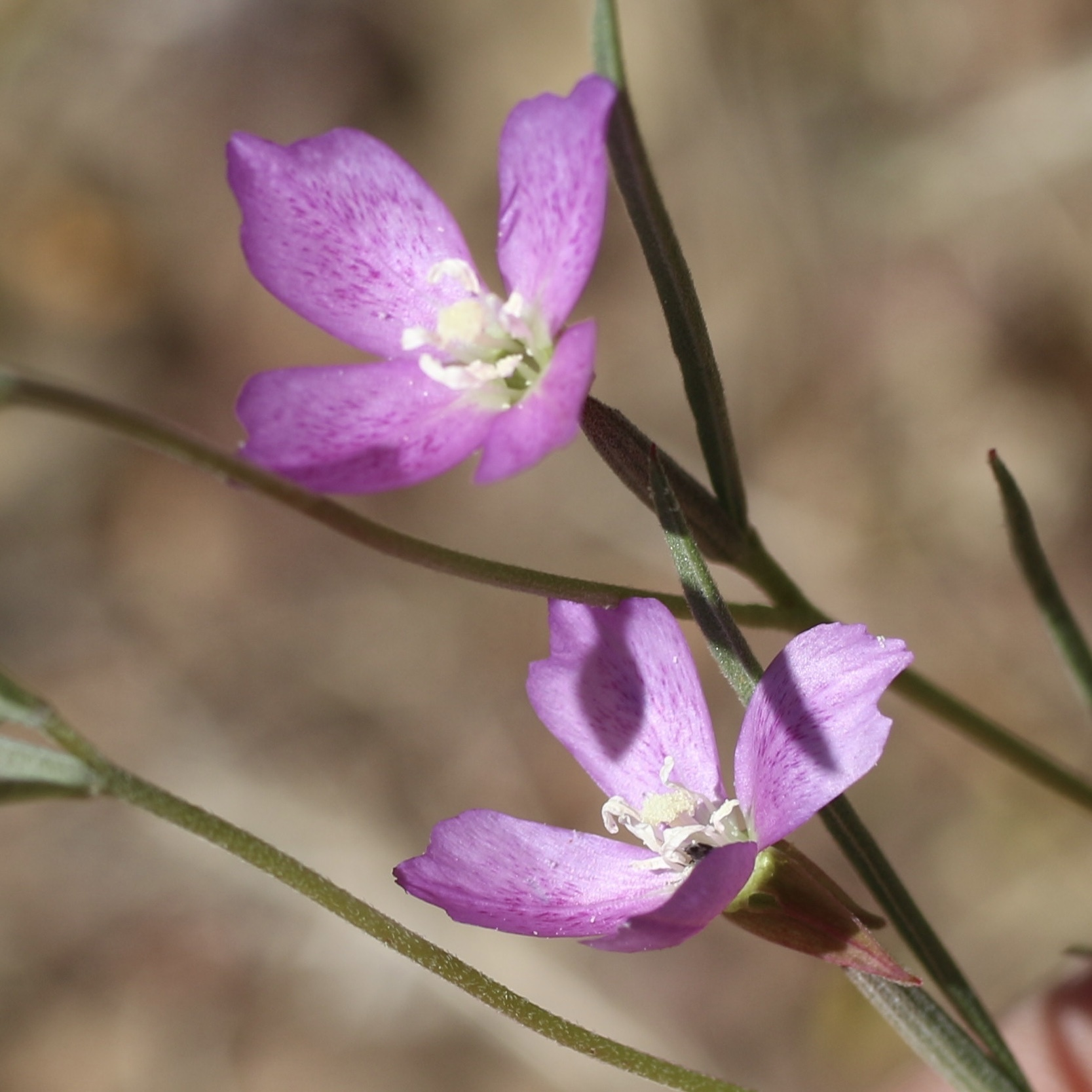

Conservation status
- Vulnerable (NatureServe)

Scientific classification
- Kingdom: Plantae
- Clade: Tracheophytes
- Clade: Angiosperms
- Clade: Eudicots
- Clade: Rosids
- Order: Myrtales
- Family: Onagraceae
- Genus: Clarkia
- Species: C. affinis

Binomial name
- Clarkia affinis H. F. Lewis & M. E. Lewis

= Clarkia affinis =

Species of flowering plant

Clarkia affinis, commonly known as chaparral clarkia, is a species of wildflower in the family Onagraceae. It is endemic to California, where it grows mainly on chaparral slopes and woodlands in the Coast Ranges. This is a spindly plant producing erect stems exceeding half a meter in height and sparse narrow leaves. The flower is a bowl-shaped bloom with four pink or red petals each 5 to 15 millimeters long. The petals may have darker spots near the base and purple or red speckling.
