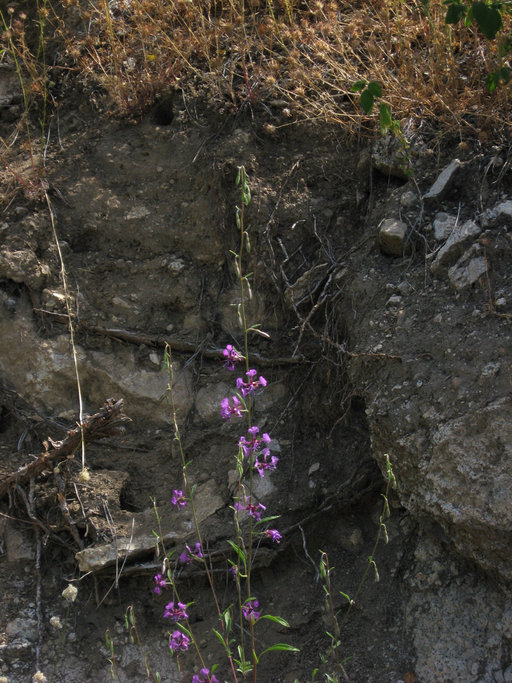

Conservation status
- Imperiled (NatureServe)

Scientific classification
- Kingdom: Plantae
- Clade: Tracheophytes
- Clade: Angiosperms
- Clade: Eudicots
- Clade: Rosids
- Order: Myrtales
- Family: Onagraceae
- Genus: Clarkia
- Species: C. mosquinii

Binomial name
- Clarkia mosquinii E.Small

= Clarkia mosquinii =

Species of flowering plant

Clarkia mosquinii is a rare species of flowering plant in the evening primrose family known by the common name Mosquin's clarkia. It is endemic to California, where it is known only from the northern Sierra Nevada foothills at the border between Butte and Plumas Counties. It was thought to be extinct until it was rediscovered in 1991. It is an erect annual herb often exceeding half a meter in height. The oval or lance-shaped leaves are 2 to 5 centimeters long. The inflorescence bears opening flowers below a series of clusters of closed, hanging flower buds. The sepals all separate as the flower blooms. The diamond-shaped petals are one to two centimeters long light to medium purple in color, and sometimes speckled with reddish purple.
