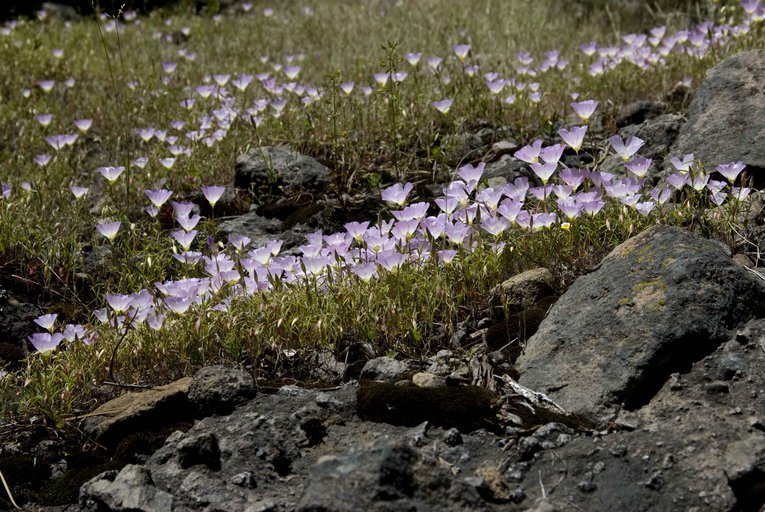

Scientific classification
- Kingdom: Plantae
- Clade: Tracheophytes
- Clade: Angiosperms
- Clade: Eudicots
- Clade: Rosids
- Order: Myrtales
- Family: Onagraceae
- Genus: Clarkia
- Species: C. arcuata

Binomial name
- Clarkia arcuata (Kellogg) A.Nels. & J.F.Macbr.

Synonyms
- Godetia hispidula

= Clarkia arcuata =

Species of flowering plant

Clarkia arcuata is a species of flowering plant in the evening primrose family known by the common name glandular clarkia. It is endemic to California, where it grows in the chaparral and woodlands of the foothills of the Sierra Nevada and southern Cascade Range.

== Description ==
It is an annual herb producing a slender, erect stem often exceeding half a meter in height. The leaves are narrow, usually linear or lance-shaped, and up to 6 centimeters long. The inflorescence bears a few flowers, which dangle when they are buds and grow erect as they open. The sepals stay fused as the petals open and emerge from one side. They are coated in glandular hairs. The petals are up to 3 centimeters long, pink-lavender in color, sometimes with a reddish blotch at the base. They form a bowl-shaped corolla. There are 8 stamens and a protruding, four-chambered ovary. The fruit is an elongated capsule which may reach 3.5 centimeters long.
