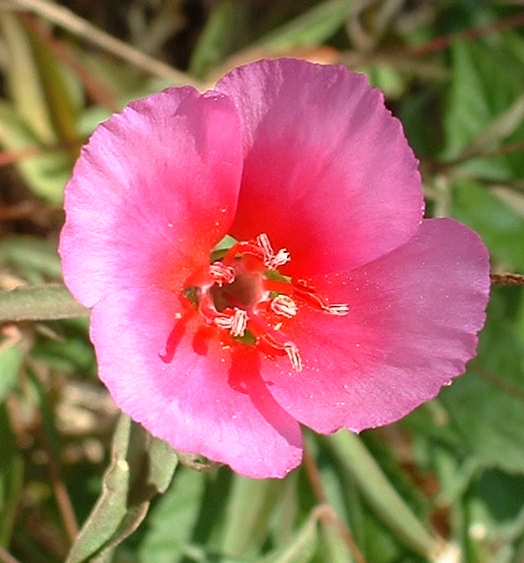
- Clarkia amoena (farewell to spring)

Scientific classification
- Kingdom: Plantae
- Clade: Tracheophytes
- Clade: Angiosperms
- Clade: Eudicots
- Clade: Rosids
- Order: Myrtales
- Family: Onagraceae
- Subfamily: Onagroideae
- Tribe: Onagreae
- Genus: Clarkia; Pursh (1813)

Type species
- Clarkia pulchella

Species
- over 40, see text

Synonyms
- Eucharidium Fisch. & C.A.Mey. (1836); Gauropsis C.Presl (1851); Godetia Spach (1835); Heterogaura Rothr. (1864); Oenotheridium Reiche (1898); Opsianthes Lilja (1840); Phaeostoma Spach (1835)

= Clarkia =

Genus of flowering plants in the willowherb family

Clarkia is a genus within the flowering plant family Onagraceae. Over 40 species are currently classified in Clarkia; almost all are native to western North America, though one species (Clarkia tenella) is native to South America.

Clarkias are typically annual herbs, growing either prostrate or erect to a height of less than 2 metres. Their leaves are small and simple, from 1 to 10 cm in length depending on the species. Their flowers have four sepals and four petals, usually white, pink, or red, and are often spotted or streaked. Their fruit are elongated, cylindrical pods, usually 4-grooved or 8-grooved, and when mature they hold many tiny, cubical seeds.

Several members of the genus are sometimes referred to by the common name "godetia", including Clarkia amoena, Clarkia affinis, and Clarkia lassenensis (the Lassen godetia). This is because they were formerly classified in a genus called Godetia, which is no longer recognised since its members have been absorbed into the genus Clarkia. Older sources may still use Godetia as a genus name.

The genus was named in honour of the explorer Captain William Clark. Unofficially, the genus is sometimes referred to as Yorkia, in honor of York, an African-American member of the Lewis and Clark Expedition.

The Royal Navy had a warship called HMS Clarkia, a Flower-class corvette.

== Cultivation ==
Some species are popular garden plants, for example the Clarkia unguiculata (mountain garland), Clarkia speciosa (redspot clarkia), Clarkia amoena (farewell to spring) and Clarkia bottae. There are cultivated varieties of some of these species.

== Ecology ==
Clarkia species play important roles in their local ecosystems, as they provide habitat for native pollinators. Some pollinators even rely on Clarkia exclusively, such as the "clarkia bee". They are also used as host plants by some species as caterpillars, such as sphingid moths.

== Species ==
As of August 2023, Plants of the World Online accepted the following species:

Image	Scientific name	Distribution
	Clarkia affinis F.H.Lewis & M.E.Lewis	California
	Clarkia amoena (Lehm.) A.Nelson & J.F.Macbr.	British Columbia south to the San Francisco Bay Area.
	Clarkia arcuata (Kellogg) A.Nelson & J.F.Macbr.	California
	Clarkia australis E.Small	California
	Clarkia biloba (Durand) A.Nelson & J.F.Macbr.	Sierra Nevada foothills
	Clarkia borealis E.Small	southern Klamath Range and the southernmost Cascade Range foothills.
	Clarkia bottae (Spach) F.H.Lewis & M.E.Lewis	southern California
	Clarkia breweri (A.Gray) Greene	California
	Clarkia concinna (Fisch. & C.A.Mey.) Greene	California
	Clarkia cylindrica (Jeps.) F.H.Lewis & M.E.Lewis	southern California Coast Ranges, western Transverse Ranges, and southern Sierra Nevada foothills.
	Clarkia davyi (Jeps.) F.H.Lewis & M.E.Lewis	California
	Clarkia delicata (Abrams) A.Nelson & J.F.Macbr.	northern Baja California and adjacent San Diego County, California
	Clarkia dudleyana (Abrams) J.F.Macbr.	Transverse Ranges and the southern Sierra Nevada foothills.
	Clarkia epilobioides (Nutt.) A.Nelson & J.F.Macbr.	California, Arizona, and Baja California
	Clarkia exilis F.H.Lewis & Vasek	western North America.
	Clarkia franciscana F.H.Lewis & P.H.Raven	San Francisco Bay Area
	Clarkia gracilis (Piper) A.Nelson & J.F.Macbr.	California, Oregon, and Washington
	Clarkia heterandra (Torr.) F.H.Lewis & P.H.Raven	California
	Clarkia imbricata F.H.Lewis & M.E.Lewis	Sonoma County, California
	Clarkia jolonensis Parn.	Monterey County, California
	Clarkia lassenensis (Eastw.) F.H.Lewis & M.E.Lewis	California, Oregon, and Nevada
	Clarkia lewisii P.H.Raven & D.R.Parn.	mountains of Monterey and San Benito Counties
	Clarkia lingulata F.H.Lewis & M.E.Lewis	Mariposa County, California
	Clarkia mildrediae (A.Heller) F.H.Lewis & M.E.Lewis	southernmost Cascade Range and northern Sierra Nevada.
	Clarkia modesta Jeps.	North and Central Coast Ranges and the Sierra Nevada foothills.
	Clarkia mosquinii E.Small	northern Sierra Nevada foothills at the border between Butte and Plumas Counties.
	Clarkia prostrata F.H.Lewis & M.E.Lewis	San Luis Obispo County, California
	Clarkia pulchella Pursh	Pacific Northwest mainly east of the Cascade Range in Washington, Oregon, Idaho, the southern margin of British Columbia
	Clarkia purpurea (Curtis) A.Nelson & J.F.Macbr.	Baja California; California; Arizona; Oregon; Washington; and British Columbia.
	Clarkia rhomboidea Douglas	western North America
	Clarkia rostrata W.S.Davis	the California oak woodlands of the Sierra Nevada foothills around the Merced River in Mariposa County.
	Clarkia rubicunda (Lindl.) F.H.Lewis & M.E.Lewis	Central Coast California
	Clarkia similis F.H.Lewis & W.R.Ernst	California
	Clarkia speciosa F.H.Lewis & M.E.Lewis	California Central Coast and mountains and from the Sierra Nevada foothills.
	Clarkia springvillensis Vasek	Tulare County, California
	Clarkia stellata Mosquin	Lake Almanor
	Clarkia tembloriensis Vasek	San Joaquin Valley, and into the adjacent Inner South California Coast Ranges
	Clarkia tenella (Cav.) F.H.Lewis & M.E.Lewis	Chile and Argentina
	Clarkia unguiculata Lindl.	California
	Clarkia virgata Greene	Sierra Nevada.
	Clarkia williamsonii (Durand & Hilg.) F.H.Lewis & M.E.Lewis	northern and central Sierra Nevada foothills.
	Clarkia xantiana A.Gray	southern Sierra Nevada and its foothills and the adjacent Transverse Ranges.
