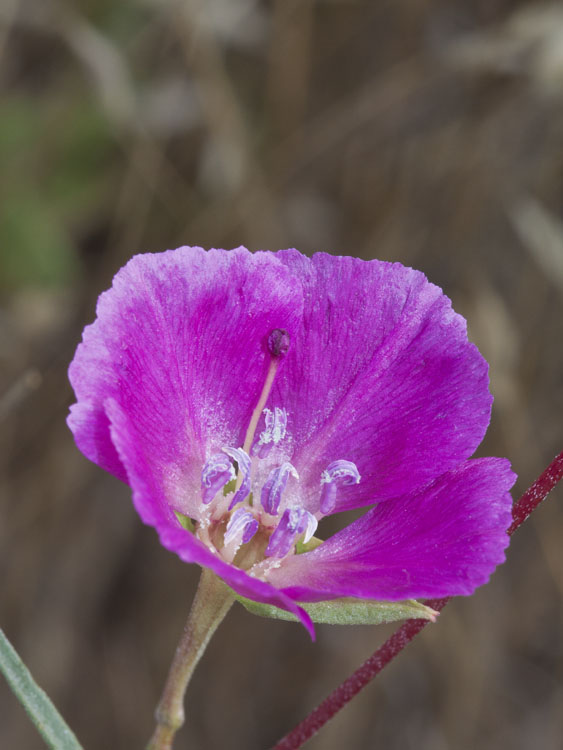

Scientific classification
- Kingdom: Plantae
- Clade: Tracheophytes
- Clade: Angiosperms
- Clade: Eudicots
- Clade: Rosids
- Order: Myrtales
- Family: Onagraceae
- Genus: Clarkia
- Species: C. speciosa

Binomial name
- Clarkia speciosa F.H.Lewis & M.E.Lewis

= Clarkia speciosa =

Species of flowering plant

Clarkia speciosa is a species of flowering plant in the evening primrose family known by the common name redspot clarkia. It is endemic to California, where it is known from the Central Coast and mountains and from the Sierra Nevada foothills. The plant is variable across its intergrading subspecies, taking a decumbent to erect form with a stem up to about half a meter long. The open or dense inflorescence has opening flowers and several closed buds. As the bud opens the sepals all separate from each other. The fan-shaped petals are up to 2.5 centimeters long and may be lavender to pink to deep red, sometimes fading to white or yellowish at the base. There is sometimes, but not always, a large bright red spot near the middle of the petal.

There are four subspecies of this plant. One, ssp. immaculata (also sometimes called var. immaculata), is known as the Pismo clarkia and is federally listed as an endangered species. It is known from about 20 occurrences on the coastline of San Luis Obispo County near Pismo Beach. This subspecies takes a decumbent form and the petals lack the red spot.

The subspecies nitens and polyantha are only found in the Sierra foothills.
