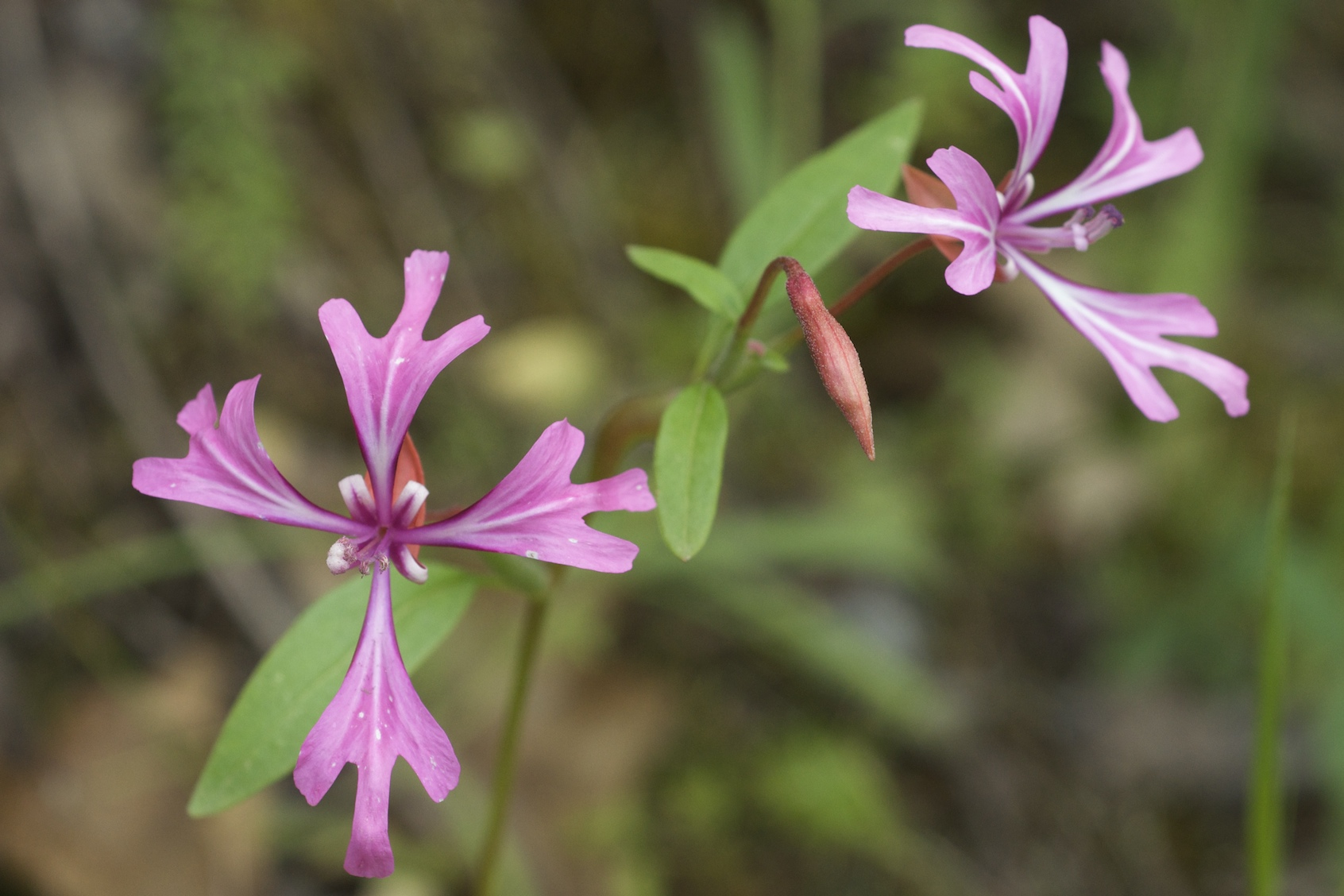

Scientific classification
- Kingdom: Plantae
- Clade: Tracheophytes
- Clade: Angiosperms
- Clade: Eudicots
- Clade: Rosids
- Order: Myrtales
- Family: Onagraceae
- Genus: Clarkia
- Species: C. concinna

Binomial name
- Clarkia concinna (Fisch. & C.A. Mey.) Greene

= Clarkia concinna =

Red ribbons

Species of flowering plant

Clarkia concinna is a species of wildflower known as red ribbons. It is endemic to California, where it can be found in the low-elevation mountains of the northern part of the state. This is an annual plant with erect, herbaceous stems. The distinctive flowers have four looping sepals of red or dark pink which look like loops of silk ribbon. The longer, pink petals have three lobes which are usually streaked with white.

Subspecies:

- C. c. automixa - Santa Clara red ribbons
- C. c. concinna - red ribbons
- C. c. raichei - Raiche's red ribbons
