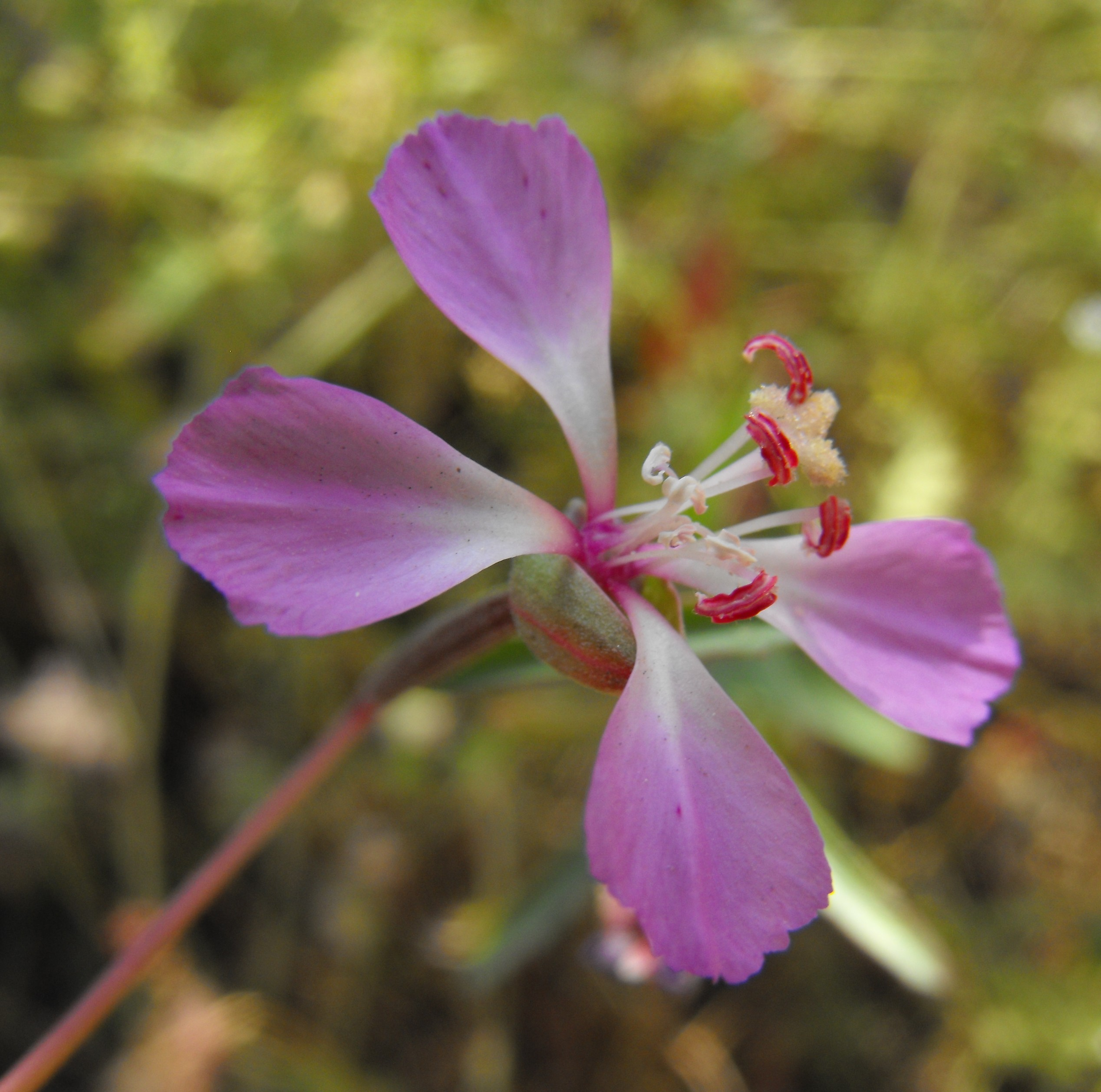

Conservation status
- Vulnerable (NatureServe)

Scientific classification
- Kingdom: Plantae
- Clade: Tracheophytes
- Clade: Angiosperms
- Clade: Eudicots
- Clade: Rosids
- Order: Myrtales
- Family: Onagraceae
- Genus: Clarkia
- Species: C. delicata

Binomial name
- Clarkia delicata (Abrams) A.Nelson & J.F.Macbr.

= Clarkia delicata =

Species of flowering plant

Clarkia delicata is a rare species of flowering plant in the evening primrose family known by the common names Campo clarkia and delicate clarkia. It is native to northern Baja California and adjacent San Diego County, California, where it grows in the woodland and chaparral of the Peninsular Ranges. This is an annual herb producing an erect stem just over half a meter in maximum height. The leaves are oval or widely lance-shaped, up to 4 centimeters long, and borne on very short petioles. The top of the stem is occupied by the inflorescence, in which the lower flowers open while the upper buds hang closed. The sepals remain fused as the flower blooms from one side. Each unlobed oval petal is about a centimeter long and pink to pinkish-lavender. There are 8 stamens, some with large orange anthers and some with smaller, paler anthers. There is also a protruding stigma with four large, fuzzy lobes.
