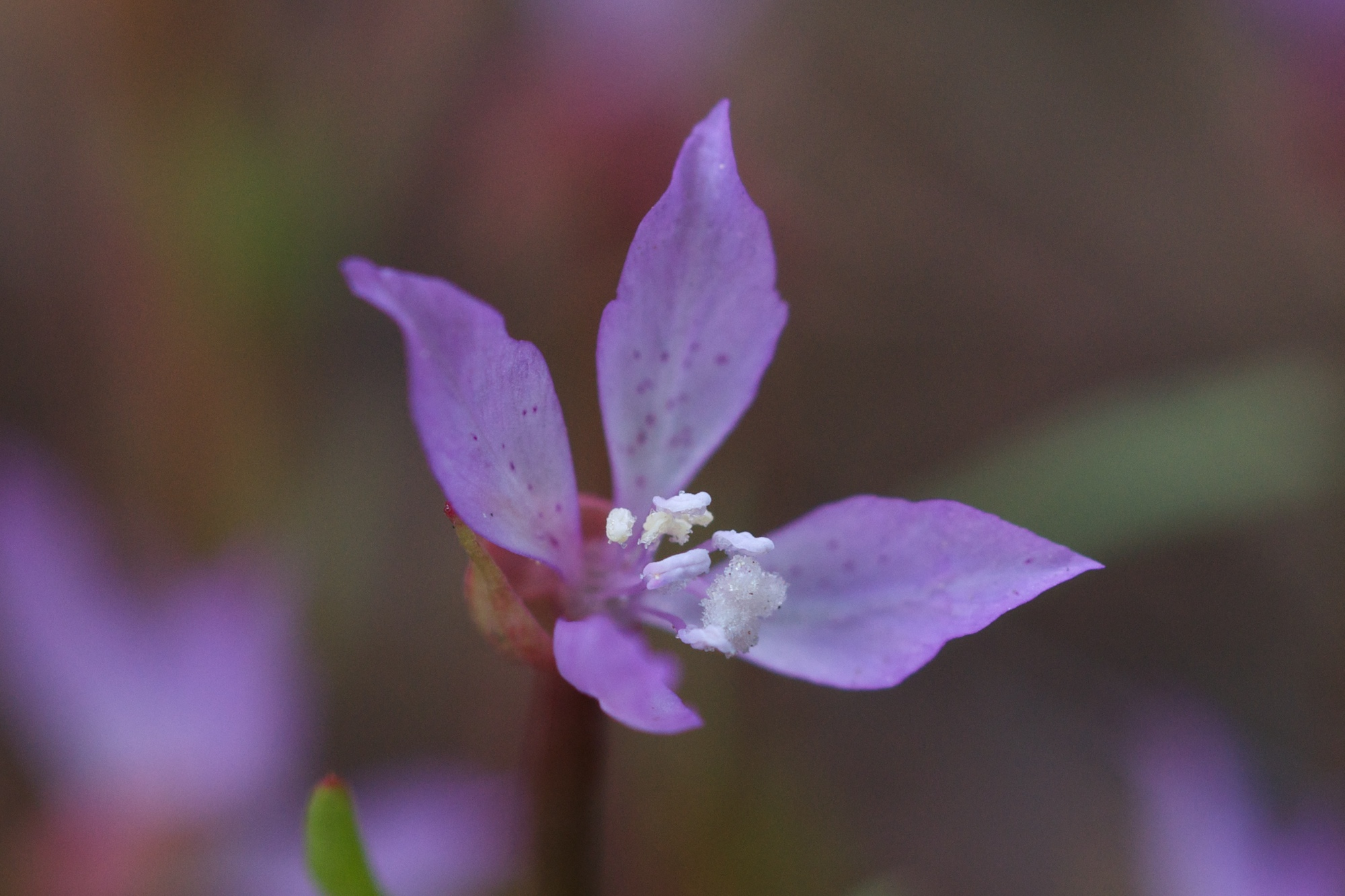

Scientific classification
- Kingdom: Plantae
- Clade: Tracheophytes
- Clade: Angiosperms
- Clade: Eudicots
- Clade: Rosids
- Order: Myrtales
- Family: Onagraceae
- Genus: Clarkia
- Species: C. modesta

Binomial name
- Clarkia modesta Jeps.

= Clarkia modesta =

Waltham Creek clarkia

Species of flowering plant

Clarkia modesta is a species of flowering plant in the evening primrose family known by the common name Waltham Creek clarkia. It is endemic to California, where it is known from the woodlands of several of the central mountain ranges, including the North and Central Coast Ranges and the Sierra Nevada foothills. It is an erect annual herb often exceeding half a meter in height. The oval, linear, or lance-shaped leaves are 2 to 4 centimeters long. The inflorescence bears opening flowers and closed, hanging flower buds. The sepals remain fused as the petals bloom from one side. The petals are about a centimeter long and vary in shape from diamond to widely lance-shaped. They are pale to deep pink and generally dark-flecked or spotted.
