= Clarkia rostrata =

Conservation status
- Imperiled (NatureServe)

Scientific classification
- Kingdom: Plantae
- Clade: Embryophytes
- Clade: Tracheophytes
- Clade: Spermatophytes
- Clade: Angiosperms
- Clade: Eudicots
- Clade: Rosids
- Order: Myrtales
- Family: Onagraceae
- Genus: Clarkia
- Species: C. rostrata

Binomial name
- Clarkia rostrata W.S.Davis

Species of flowering plant

Clarkia rostrata is a species of flowering plant in the evening primrose family known by the common name beaked clarkia.

== Distribution ==
The wildflower is endemic to California, where it is known from the California oak woodlands of the Sierra Nevada foothills around the Merced River in Mariposa County.

== Description ==
Clarkia rostrata is an annual herb that grows erect to about 0.5 metres (1.6 ft) in maximum height. The lance-shaped leaves are up to about 6 centimetres (2.4 in) long.

The inflorescence bears opening flowers below closed, hanging flower buds. The reddish or purplish sepals stay fused together as the flower opens from one side. The fan-shaped petals are lavender-pink, lightening to nearly white at the bases, where it turns reddish purple. There are 8 stamens, some tipped with large lavender anthers and some with smaller, paler anthers.
