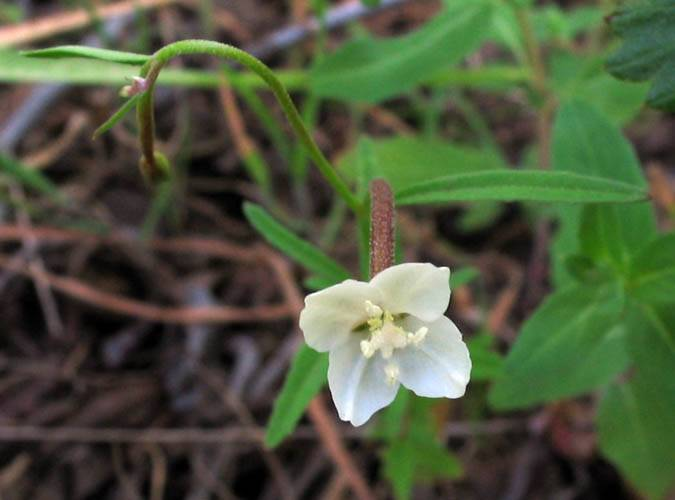

Conservation status
- Secure (NatureServe)

Scientific classification
- Kingdom: Plantae
- Clade: Tracheophytes
- Clade: Angiosperms
- Clade: Eudicots
- Clade: Rosids
- Order: Myrtales
- Family: Onagraceae
- Genus: Clarkia
- Species: C. epilobioides

Binomial name
- Clarkia epilobioides (Nutt. ex Torr. & A.Gray) A.Nelson & J.F.Macbr.

= Clarkia epilobioides =

Species of flowering plant

Clarkia epilobioides is a species of flowering plant in the evening primrose family known by the common name canyon clarkia. It is native to California, Arizona, and Baja California, where it grows in shaded habitat in woodland and chaparral. It is an annual herb producing a slender, erect stem sometimes exceeding half a meter in height. The leaves are narrowly to widely lance-shaped and less than 3 centimeters long. The top of the stem is occupied by the inflorescence. Each hanging bud has four red sepals which remain fused all together or in pairs as the petals emerge during blooming. The petals are one half to one centimeter long, oval in shape, solid white or cream in color, often fading pink as they age. There are eight protruding stamens and one stigma.
