= Clarkia lassenensis =

Scientific classification
- Kingdom: Plantae
- Clade: Tracheophytes
- Clade: Angiosperms
- Clade: Eudicots
- Clade: Rosids
- Order: Myrtales
- Family: Onagraceae
- Genus: Clarkia
- Species: C. lassenensis

Binomial name
- Clarkia lassenensis (Eastw.) H. F. Lewis & M. E. Lewis

Synonyms
- Godetia lassenensis

Species of flowering plant

Clarkia lassenensis is a species of wildflower known by the common name Lassen clarkia. This plant is native to the US states of California, Oregon, and Nevada, where it grows in the mountains and forested plateau. The plant erects a spindly stem and bears sparse narrow leaves. The bowl-shaped flower has four lavender petals with reddish bases, each about one centimeter long. Clarkia lassenensis is pollinated by both native bees and butterflies and is usually in bloom in the late spring early summer months of May and June. The flower is a resident of Mount Lassen, from which it gets its name.
