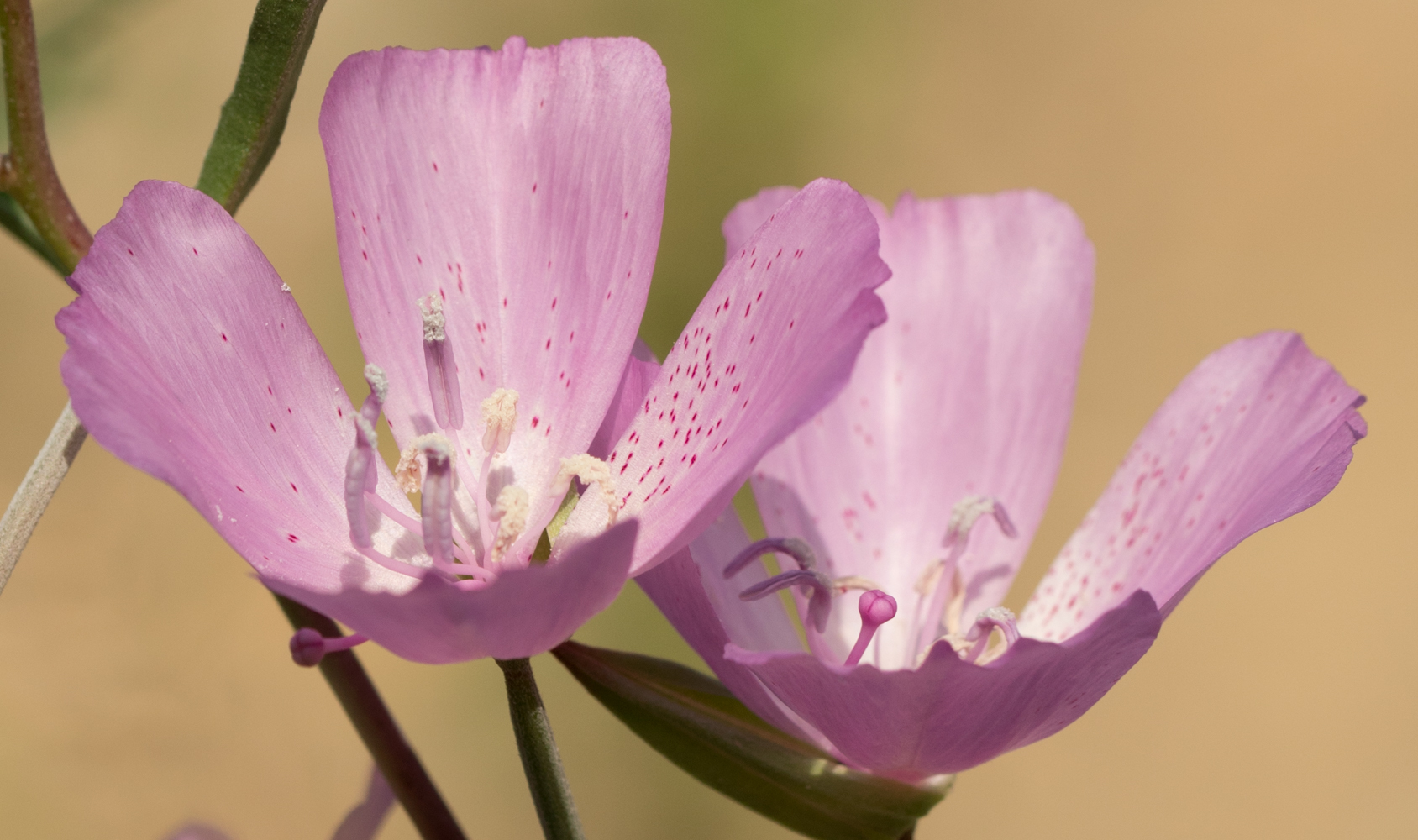

Scientific classification
- Kingdom: Plantae
- Clade: Tracheophytes
- Clade: Angiosperms
- Clade: Eudicots
- Clade: Rosids
- Order: Myrtales
- Family: Onagraceae
- Genus: Clarkia
- Species: C. dudleyana

Binomial name
- Clarkia dudleyana (Abrams) J.F.Macbr.

Synonyms
- Godetia dudleyana Abrams

= Clarkia dudleyana =

Species of flowering plant

Clarkia dudleyana is a species of flowering plant in the evening primrose family known by the common name Dudley's clarkia. It is endemic to California, where it can be found in the mountains of the Transverse Ranges and the southern Sierra Nevada foothills. It grows in woodland, forest, and chaparral habitats under 1,500 meters in elevation. This annual herb produces an upright stem which sometimes exceeds half a meter in height. The leaves are lance-shaped, up to 7 centimeters long, and borne on short petioles. The top of the stem is occupied by the inflorescence, which has opening flowers below closed, hanging buds. As the flower blooms, the pink to reddish-purple sepals remain fused, opening along one side only. The petals are up to 3 centimeters long, fan-shaped, pinkish lavender in color and sometimes flecked with red. There are 8 stamens, some of which have large lavender anthers and some that have smaller, paler anthers. The stigma protrudes further than the stamens.
