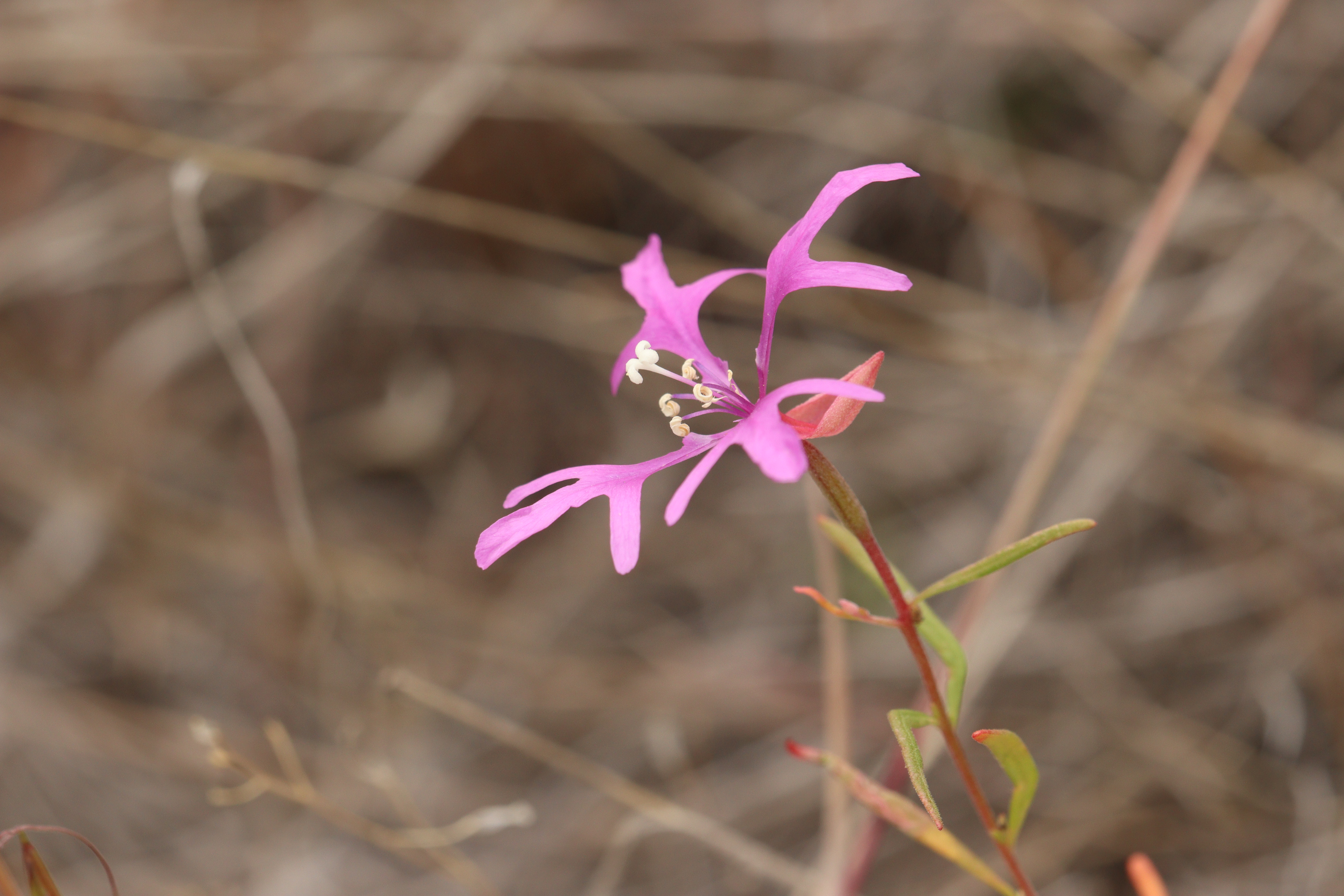

Scientific classification
- Kingdom: Plantae
- Clade: Tracheophytes
- Clade: Angiosperms
- Clade: Eudicots
- Clade: Rosids
- Order: Myrtales
- Family: Onagraceae
- Genus: Clarkia
- Species: C. pulchella

Binomial name
- Clarkia pulchella Pursh

= Clarkia pulchella =

Species of flowering plant

Clarkia pulchella, also known as pinkfairies, ragged robin, and deerhorn clarkia, is a species of flowering plant in the family Onagraceae.

== Description ==
An herbaceous perennial plant, it is the type species of Clarkia. This plant is 10–50 cm (3 7/8–19 5/8 in), erect, branched or not, and covered with short hairs. The leaves alternate along the stalk and are lance to spoon-shaped, about 2–7 cm (3/4–2 3/4 in) long and sometimes finely toothed. The distinctive lavender to light purple flowers are four-lobed and fused at the base. Each lobe is in turn three-lobed with the middle lobe widest.

== Distribution and habitat ==
Clarkia pulchella is found in the Pacific Northwest mainly east of the Cascade Range in Washington, Oregon, Idaho, the southern margin of British Columbia and the extreme west of Montana. Occurring over a wide range of elevations, it is most common from 610–1,520 m (2,000–5,000 ft). Its habitat is often forest, rocky, grassland or disturbed.

== Discovery ==
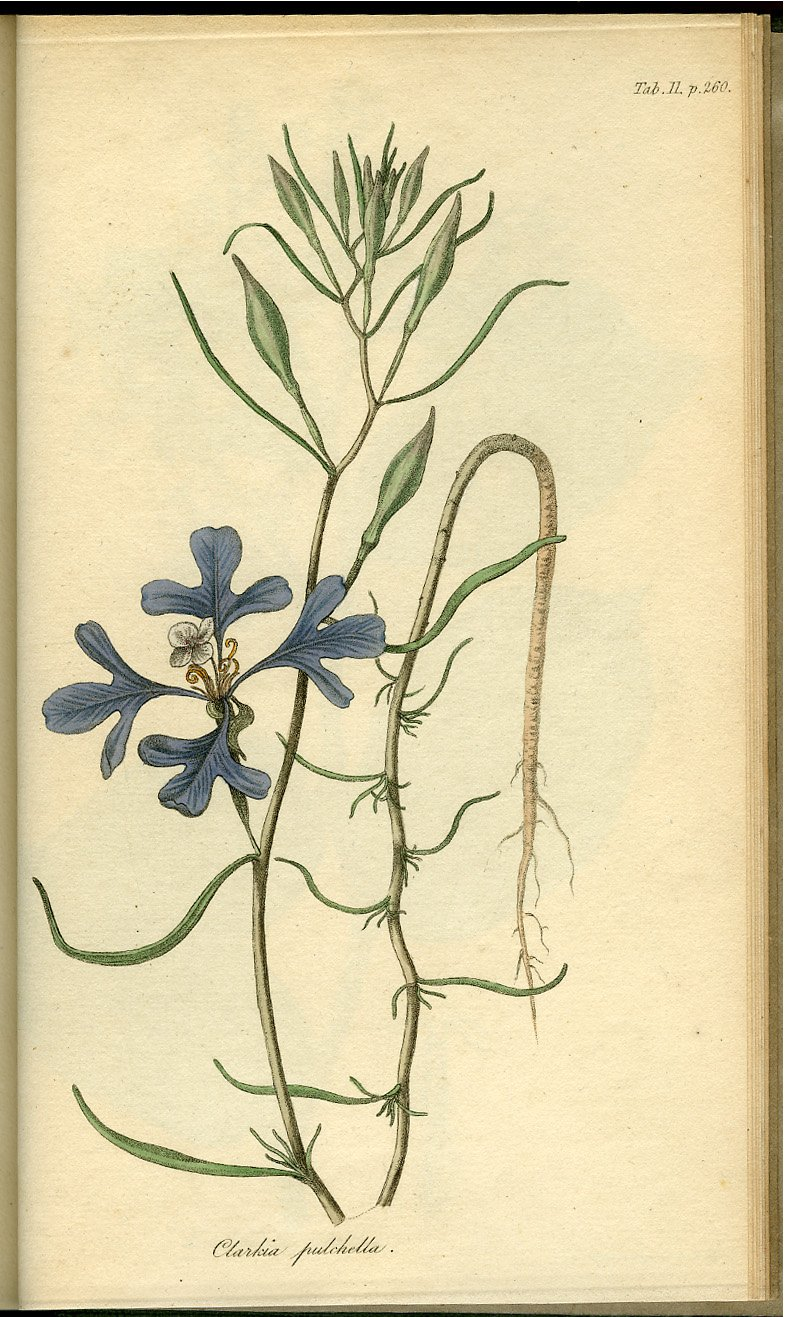
A painting of Clarkia pulchella by Frederick Pursh

It was described by Meriwether Lewis close to Kamiah, Idaho during the Lewis and Clark Expedition and it was subsequently brought back as a botanical specimen. The discovery was first described on May 28, 1806, by William Clark and subsequently by Lewis on June 1 of that year in a journal entry stating that:

I met with a singular plant today in blume of which I preserved a specemine; it grows on the steep sides of the fertile hills near this place, the radix is fibrous, not much branched, annual, woody, white and nearly smooth. the stem is simple branching ascending, 2½ feet high celindric, villose and of a pale red colour. the branches are but few and those near its upper extremity. the extremities of the branches are flexible and are bent down near their extremities with the weight of the flowers. the leaf is sissile, scattered thinly, nearly linear tho' somewhat widest in the middle, two inches in length absolutely entire, villose, obtusely pointed and of an ordinary green. above each leaf a small short branch protrudes, supporting a tissue of four or five smaller leaves of the same appearance with those described. a leaf is placed underneath each branch, and each flower. the calyx is a one flowered spathe. the corolla superior consists of four pale purple petals which are tripartite, the central lobe largest and all terminate obtusely; they are inserted with a long and narrow claw on the top of the germ, are long, smooth, & deciduous. there are two distinct sets of stamens the 1st or principal consist of four, the filaments of which are capillary, erect, inserted on the top of the germ alternately with the petals, equal short, membranous; the anthers are also four each being elivated with its filament, they are linear and rather flat, erect sessile, cohering at the base, membranous, longitudinally furrowed, twice as long as the filament naked, and of a pale purple colour. the second set of stamens are very minute are also four and placed within and opposite to the petals, these are scarcely perceptible while the 1st are large and conspicuous; the filaments are capillary equal, very short, white and smooth. the anthers are four, oblong, beaked, erect, cohering at the base, membranous, shorter than the filaments, white naked and appear not to form pollen. there is one pistillum; the germ of which is also one, cilindric, villous, inferior, sessile, as long as the 1st stamens, and marked with 8 longitudinal furrows. the single style and stigma form a perfect monapetallous corolla only with this difference, that the style which elivates the stigma or limb is not a tube but solid tho' its outer appearance is that of the tube of a monopetallous corolla swelling as it ascends and gliding in such manner into the limb that it cannot be said where the style ends, or the stigma begins; jointly they are as long as the corolla, white, the limb is four cleft, saucer shaped, and the margins of the lobes entire and rounded. this has the appearance of a monopetallous flower growing from the center of a four petalled corollar, which is rendered more conspicuous in consequence of the 1st being white and the latter of a pale purple. I regret very much that the seed of this plant are not yet ripe and it is probable that it will not be so during my residence in this neighbourhood.

It was not until 1814 however that the plant was classified and named Clarckia pulchella by Frederick Traugott Pursh in honor of Clark even though in his journal entry he acknowledged Lewis as the discoverer. At the time of its publication by Pursh it was the first species assigned to the newly created genus Clarckia. The genus was later renamed as Clarkia. Then in 1826 David Douglas brought back samples of the plant to England after an expedition to the northwest United States from 1824 to 1828.

Clarkia pulchella is most famous for its use by botanist Robert Brown in the discovery of Brownian motion. Brown studied the pollen of Clarkia pulchella while immersed in water under the microscope. He used these pollen granules because they contain oblong particles, which he observed were 6 to 8 micrometres in length, and he thought that he could follow their progress during fertilization, which was the initial subject of his investigation. The plant is also known for its use by Newman and Pilson to demonstrate a causal relationship between genetic variation in a population and population survival.
