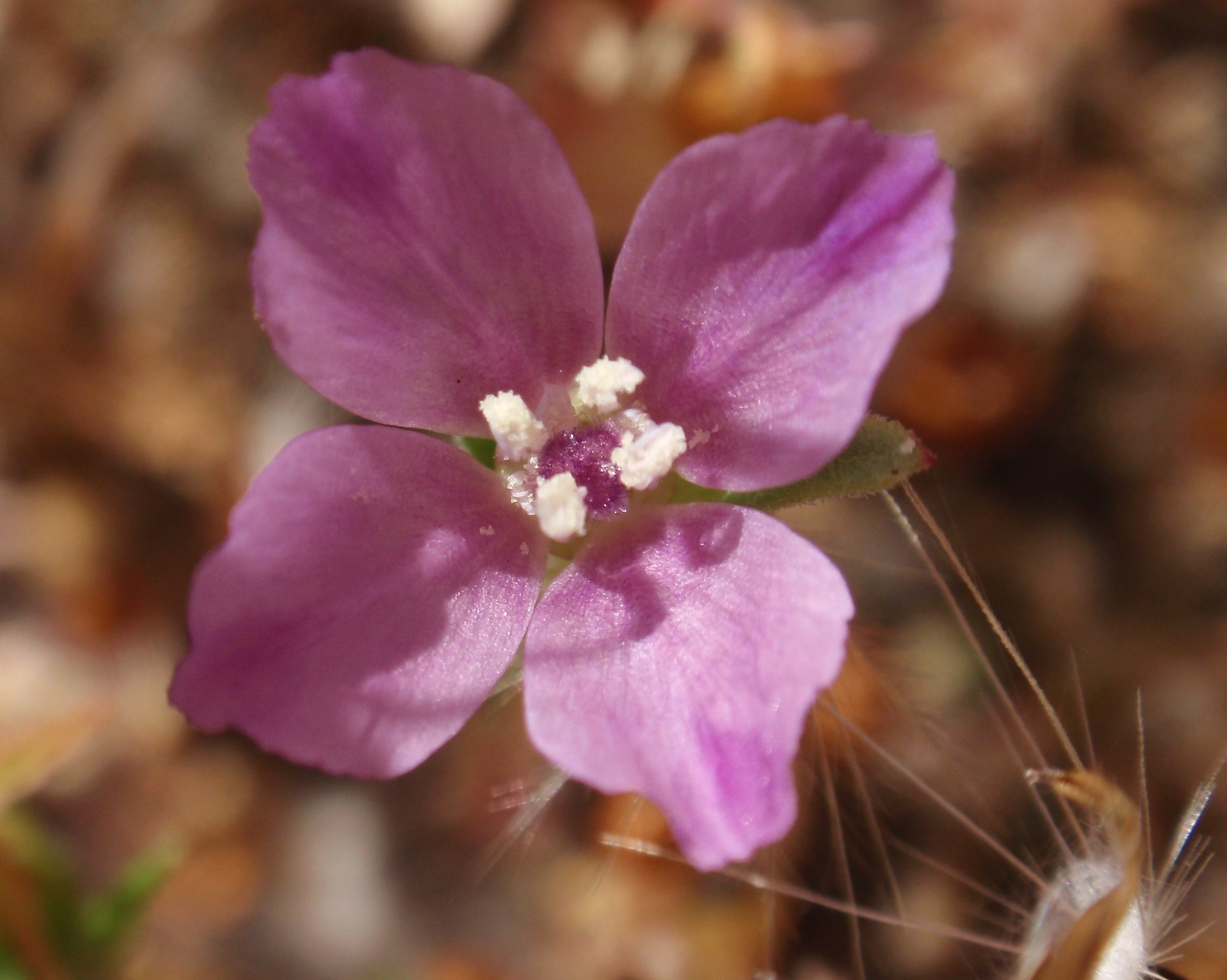

Scientific classification
- Kingdom: Plantae
- Clade: Tracheophytes
- Clade: Angiosperms
- Clade: Eudicots
- Clade: Rosids
- Order: Myrtales
- Family: Onagraceae
- Genus: Clarkia
- Species: C. gracilis

Binomial name
- Clarkia gracilis (Piper) A. Nels. & J. F. Macbr.

= Clarkia gracilis =

Species of flowering plant

Clarkia gracilis is a species of wildflower known by the common name slender clarkia. This plant is native to the US states of California, Oregon, and Washington, where it is found in coastal, foothill, valley, and low-elevation mountain habitats. The plant is variable across subspecies but is generally an erect slender stem with a few sparse, narrow leaves several centimeters long. It bears an inflorescence of drooping buds which open into bowl-shaped flowers with pinkish lavender petals 1 to 4 centimeters long and bearing a red or white splotch which can appear in the center or at the base of the petal, depending on the subspecies.

Subspecies:

- C. g. ssp. albicaulis - (white-stemmed clarkia) - an uncommon subspecies known only from Butte County, California
- C. g. ssp. gracilis - a more common subspecies
- C. g. ssp. sonomensis - (Sonoma clarkia) - found in northern California and southern Oregon
- C. g. ssp. tracyi - (Tracy's clarkia) - limited to the inland Northern Coast Ranges of California
