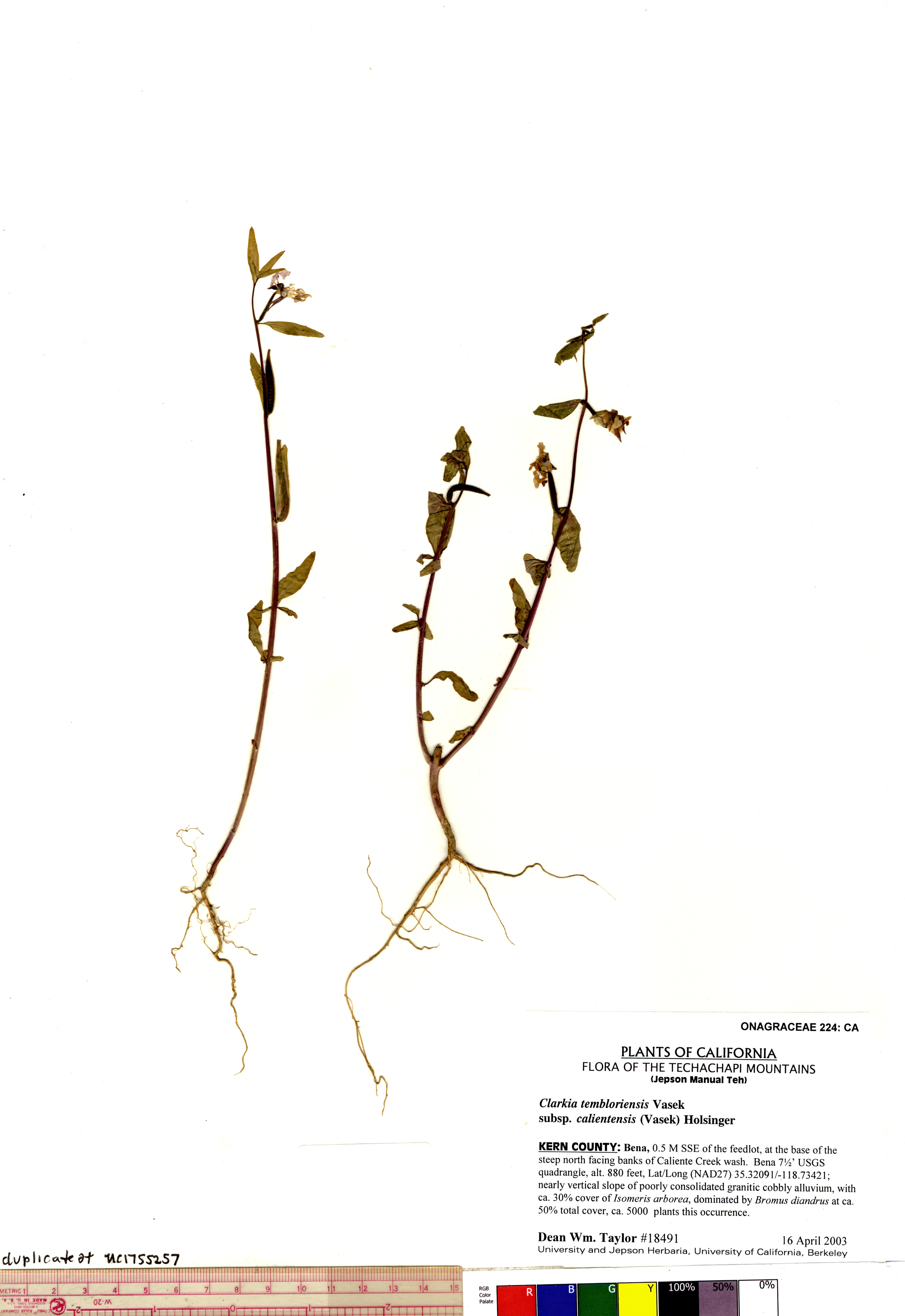

Conservation status
- Vulnerable (NatureServe)

Scientific classification
- Kingdom: Plantae
- Clade: Tracheophytes
- Clade: Angiosperms
- Clade: Eudicots
- Clade: Rosids
- Order: Myrtales
- Family: Onagraceae
- Genus: Clarkia
- Species: C. tembloriensis

Binomial name
- Clarkia tembloriensis Vasek

= Clarkia tembloriensis =

Species of flowering plant

Clarkia tembloriensis is a rare species of flowering plant in the evening primrose family, known by the common name Temblor Range clarkia and belonging to the Onagraceae family.

== Description ==
Clarkia tembloriensis is an erect annual herb exceeding 0.5 metres (1.6 ft) in maximum height. The lance-shaped leaves are gray-green in color and waxy, reaching 7 centimeters long.

The inflorescence has open flowers and hanging closed buds. The fuzzy greenish sepals stay fused together as the petals bloom from one side. The herbage may be tinted with red.

The flower petals have diamond-shaped blades at the end of long claws. They are pinkish-lavender, sometimes with a large purple spot near the base. There are 8 stamens, some with large red or purple anthers and some with smaller, paler anthers.

=== Subspecies ===
Hybrids between subspecies have low fertility. The two current subspecies are:

- Clarkia tembloriensis ssp. calientensis — Vasek's clarkia — found at only three sites near Caliente Creek in the Caliente Hills, at ~500 feet (150 m) in an ecotone of the Sierra Nevada foothills and San Joaquin Valley, in Kern County. Calflora Database: Clarkia tembloriensis ssp. calientensis] This subspecies was originally described as a distinct species named Clarkia calientensis, and analyses suggests it could be returned to species status. The most rare of the subspecies, it is considered vulnerable to extinction with such small populations located on privately owned land. The sites are part of the Tejon Ranch, and managed by the Tejon Ranch Conservancy.
- Clarkia tembloriensis ssp. tembloriensis (syn: Clarkia tembloriensis subsp. longistyla) — Temblor Range clarkia — distribution along the western San Joaquin Valley into the eastern Inner South California Coast Ranges, from the Diablo Range to the Temblor Range and Carrizo Plain areas.

== Distribution and habitat ==
The wildflower is endemic to California, where it is native to the San Joaquin Valley, and into the adjacent Inner South California Coast Ranges on its west, including the namesake Temblor Range, and occasionally into the Sierra Nevada foothills on its southeast. It is found in chaparral scrub and grassland habitats, at 100–500 metres (330–1,640 ft) in elevation.
