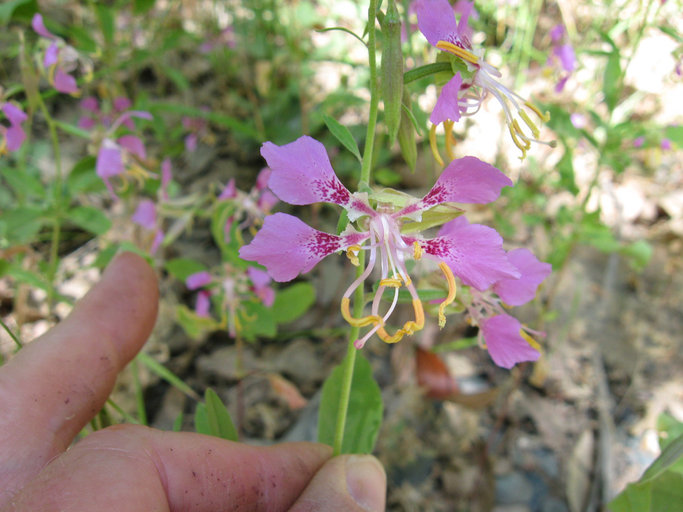
- ssp. lutescens

Conservation status
- Vulnerable (NatureServe)

Scientific classification
- Kingdom: Plantae
- Clade: Tracheophytes
- Clade: Angiosperms
- Clade: Eudicots
- Clade: Rosids
- Order: Myrtales
- Family: Onagraceae
- Genus: Clarkia
- Species: C. mildrediae

Binomial name
- Clarkia mildrediae (A.Heller) F.H.Lewis & M.E.Lewis

= Clarkia mildrediae =

Species of flowering plant

Clarkia mildrediae is an uncommon species of flowering plant in the evening primrose family known by the common name Mildred's clarkia. It is endemic to California, where it is known from the forests of the southernmost Cascade Range and northern Sierra Nevada. It is an erect annual herb often exceeding half a meter in height. The oval leaves grow up to 6 centimeters long and are borne on petioles of up to 4 centimeters. The inflorescence bears opening flowers and hanging, pointed flower buds. As the bud opens the sepals all separate instead of remaining fused as those of many other Clarkia species do. The triangular to semicircular petals are about 2 centimeters long and lavender to bright reddish-purple, sometimes with dark speckling. There are 8 stamens with anthers all alike, and a protruding stigma.
