= Clarkia borealis =

Conservation status
- Vulnerable (NatureServe)

Scientific classification
- Kingdom: Plantae
- Clade: Tracheophytes
- Clade: Angiosperms
- Clade: Eudicots
- Clade: Rosids
- Order: Myrtales
- Family: Onagraceae
- Genus: Clarkia
- Species: C. borealis

Binomial name
- Clarkia borealis E.Small

Species of flowering plant

Clarkia borealis is a rare species of flowering plant in the evening primrose family known by the common name northern clarkia. It is endemic to California, where it is known from the forests of the southern Klamath Range and the southernmost Cascade Range foothills. It is an annual herb growing an erect, slender stem. The leaves are oval in shape and borne on short petioles. The top of the stem is occupied by the inflorescence, in which the lowest flowers open first and hanging, pointed flower buds occur at nodes at the top. The sepals separate as the flower blooms, revealing purplish pink petals. Each petal is between 1 and two centimeters long, elongated triangular to semicircular in shape, and sometimes flecked with dark purple. There are 8 stamens with anthers bearing blue-gray pollen, and a protruding stigma.

Both subspecies of this plant are rare. ssp. biloba is known from only about 20 occurrences in Shasta and Trinity Counties, and the even less common ssp. arida, the Shasta clarkia, is known only from the forests around Shingletown.
