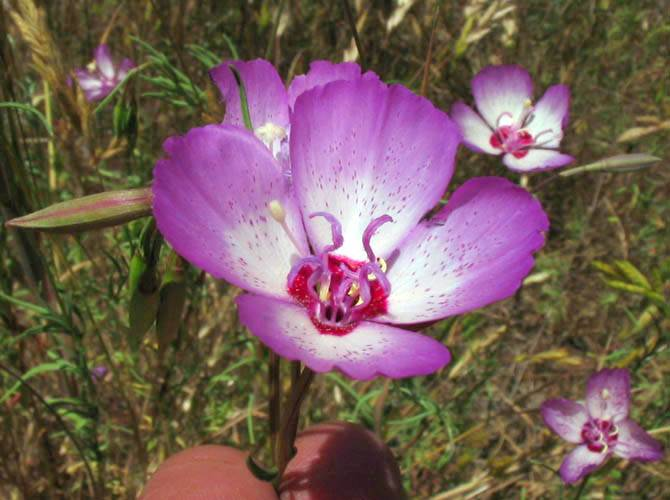

Scientific classification
- Kingdom: Plantae
- Clade: Tracheophytes
- Clade: Angiosperms
- Clade: Eudicots
- Clade: Rosids
- Order: Myrtales
- Family: Onagraceae
- Genus: Clarkia
- Species: C. cylindrica

Binomial name
- Clarkia cylindrica (Jeps.) F.H.Lewis & M.E.Lewis

= Clarkia cylindrica =

Species of flowering plant

Clarkia cylindrica is a species of flowering plant in the evening primrose family known by the common name speckled fairy fan, or speckled clarkia.

It is endemic to California, where it grows in the chaparral, oak woodlands, and grasslands of the southern California Coast Ranges, western Transverse Ranges, and southern Sierra Nevada foothills.

== Description ==
Clarkia cylindrica is an annual herb producing an erect stem to around 0.5 metres (1.6 ft) in maximum height. Leaves are mainly linear in shape and up to six centimeters long.

The inflorescence holds several flowers which hang heavily when they are buds and then grow erect as they open. Each open flower is a bowl of four fan-shaped petals up to about 3.5 centimeters long. The petals are intergrading shades of lavender, white, and magenta and they are often speckled with purple or pink. Beneath the petals are bright pink fused sepals. There are eight stamens with lavender anthers.

The fruit is a cylindrical capsule up to 5 centimeters long.
