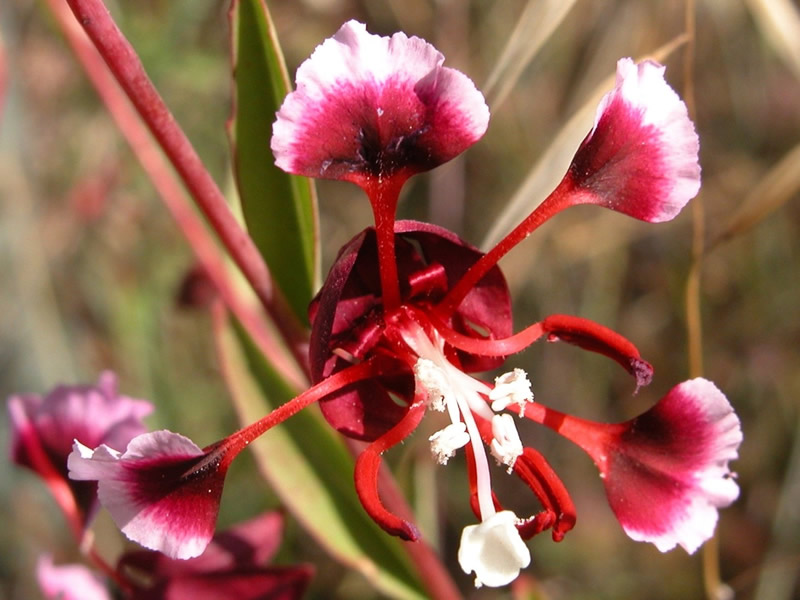

Conservation status
- Threatened (ESA)

Scientific classification
- Kingdom: Plantae
- Clade: Tracheophytes
- Clade: Angiosperms
- Clade: Eudicots
- Clade: Rosids
- Order: Myrtales
- Family: Onagraceae
- Genus: Clarkia
- Species: C. springvillensis

Binomial name
- Clarkia springvillensis Vasek

= Clarkia springvillensis =

Species of flowering plant

Clarkia springvillensis is a rare species of flowering plant in the evening primrose family known by the common name Springville clarkia. It is endemic to central Tulare County, California, where it is known from fewer than 20 occurrences around Springville. It is a federally listed threatened species.

== Distribution and habitat ==
A few populations of this plant are located on private land, but several others grow on land at least partially protected by the California Department of Fish and Game, the Bureau of Land Management, and the US Forest Service within the bounds of Sequoia National Forest.

Threats to the species include non-native plant species, road maintenance, grazing and trampling by livestock, and development; the population growing on the type locality near Springville was extirpated when the land was made into a mobile home park.

== Description ==
Clarkia springvillensis is an annual herb growing erect to approach a maximum height near 1 metre (3.3 ft). The lance-shaped leaves are up to 9 centimeters long. The herbage is hairless and waxy in texture.

The inflorescence bears open flowers and hanging, closed flower buds. The deep red sepals remain fused together as the petals bloom from one side. Each petal is a diamond-shaped blade at the end of a long claw. It is pinkish-lavender with a purple spot at the base. There are 8 stamens, some with large, red anthers and some with smaller, paler anthers. The stigma protrudes from the center.

Clarkia springvillensis was first described by Frank Charles Vasek in a 1964 issue of Madroño, the journal of the California Botanical Society.
