= Clarkia similis =

Scientific classification
- Kingdom: Plantae
- Clade: Tracheophytes
- Clade: Angiosperms
- Clade: Eudicots
- Clade: Rosids
- Order: Myrtales
- Family: Onagraceae
- Genus: Clarkia
- Species: C. similis

Binomial name
- Clarkia similis F.H.Lewis & Ernst

Species of flowering plant

Clarkia similis is a species of flowering plant in the evening primrose family known by the common name Ramona clarkia. It is endemic to California, where it is found in the coastal hills and mountains of the southwestern part of the state. It is an annual herb that grows erect, approaching a meter in maximum height. The inflorescence bears open flowers and closed, hanging flower buds. The sepals remain fused as the petals bloom from one side. The petals are less than a centimeter long and oval to diamond in shape. They are pale pink with white near the bases, and sometimes purple-speckled.
