= Clarkia lewisii =

Scientific classification
- Kingdom: Plantae
- Clade: Tracheophytes
- Clade: Angiosperms
- Clade: Eudicots
- Clade: Rosids
- Order: Myrtales
- Family: Onagraceae
- Genus: Clarkia
- Species: C. lewisii

Binomial name
- Clarkia lewisii P.H. Raven & Parnell

Species of flowering plant

Clarkia lewisii is an uncommon species of flowering plant in the evening primrose family known by the common name Lewis' clarkia. It is endemic to California, where it is known from the hills and mountains of Monterey and San Benito Counties.

== Description ==
It is an erect annual herb generally under half a meter in height. The lance-shaped leaves are a few centimeters long have petioles shorter than 7 mm, with blades 2-5 cm long.. The inflorescence bears opening flowers and closed, hanging flower buds. The flower's tube measures 1.5-4 mm and has a ring of hairs at the rim. As the bud opens the pink or purple sepals stay fused as the petals bloom from one side. The fan-shaped petals are up to 3 centimeters long, pink to lavender with white and red coloration near the bases. There are 8 stamens and a protruding stigma. The ovary is four-grooved, with the stigma extending beyond the anthers. The fruit is cylindrical, measuring 1.5-7 cm.
