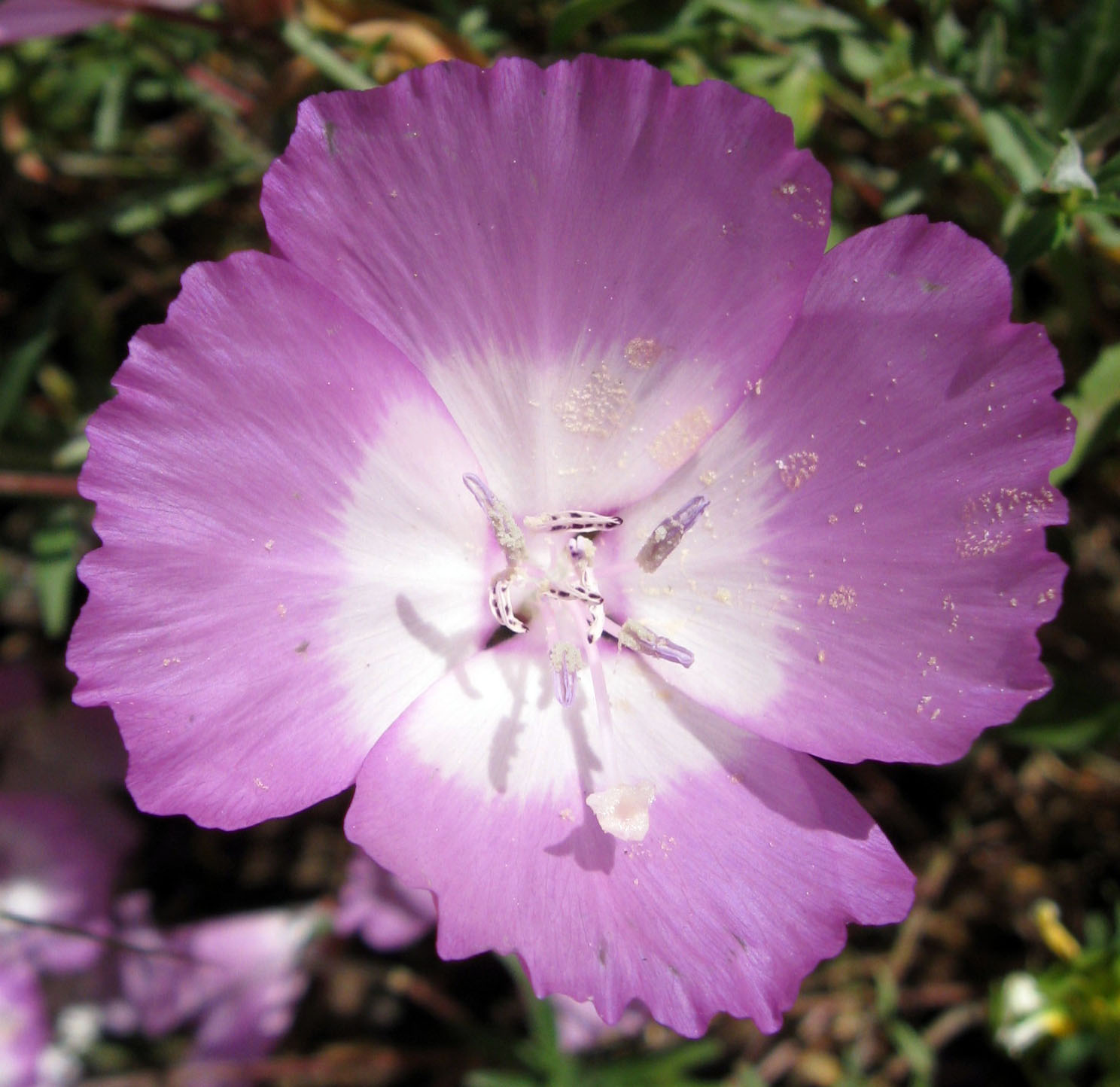

Scientific classification
- Kingdom: Plantae
- Clade: Tracheophytes
- Clade: Angiosperms
- Clade: Eudicots
- Clade: Rosids
- Order: Myrtales
- Family: Onagraceae
- Genus: Clarkia
- Species: C. bottae

Binomial name
- Clarkia bottae (Spach) F.H.Lewis & M.E.Lewis

Synonyms
- Clarkia deflexa Godetia bottae

= Clarkia bottae =

Species of flowering plant

Clarkia bottae is a species of wildflower with several common names, including punchbowl godetia, Botta's clarkia, Botta's fairy fan, and hill clarkia.

== Description ==
Clarkia bottae produces spindly, waxy stems which may approach a meter in height, and sparse narrow leaves.

The flower is a bowl shaped bloom with lavender or pinkish-purple petals, often lighter in color toward the base and speckled with red, each 1 to 3 centimeters long. The stigma protrudes from the corolla and is surrounded by shorter stamens.

== Distribution and habitat ==
Clarkia bottae is endemic to the mountains of southern California. It is found in chaparral and coastal scrub plant communities.

== Cultivation ==
Cultivars include Lilac Pixie.

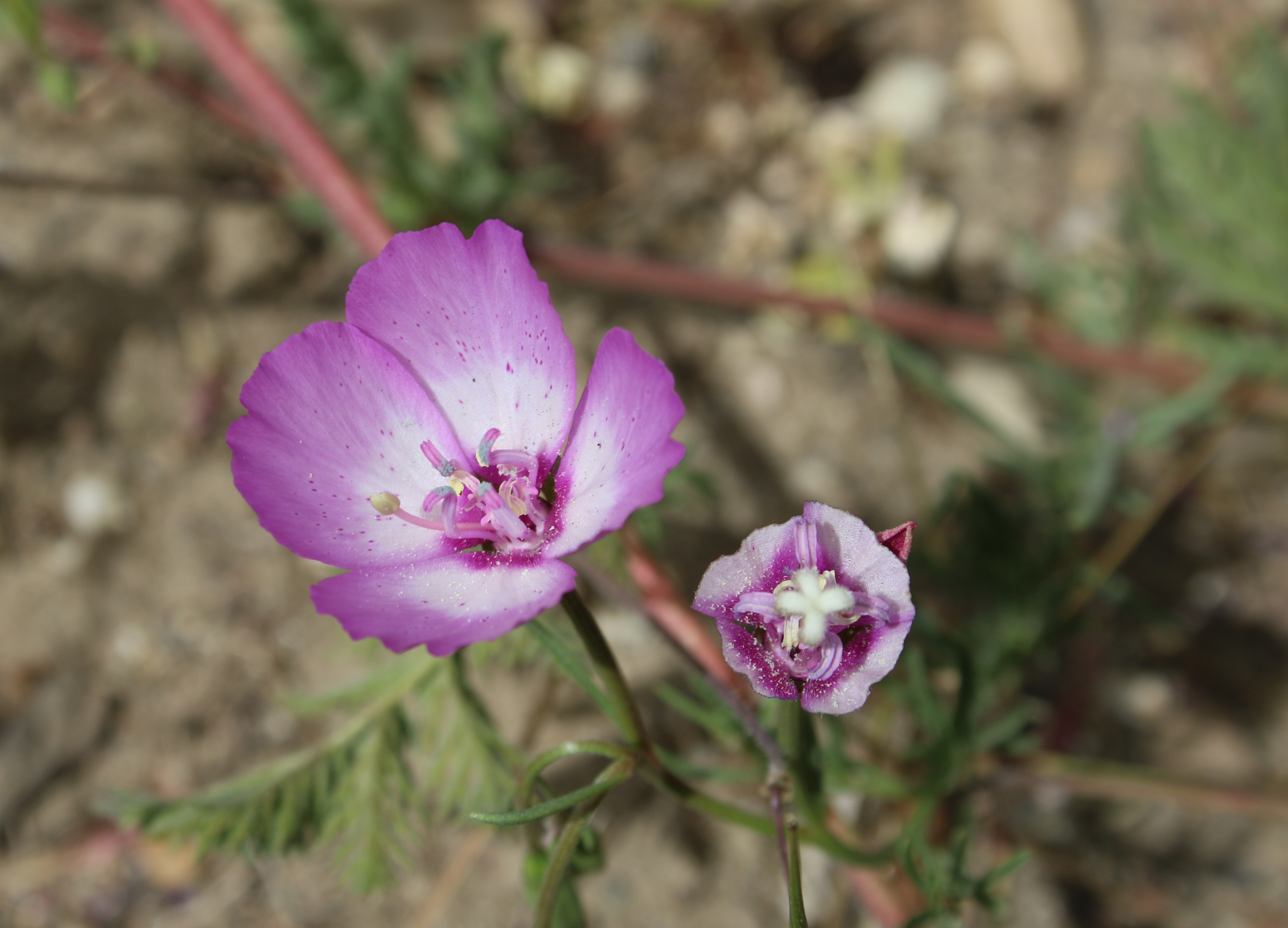
Clarkia bottae near Santa Clarita, California
