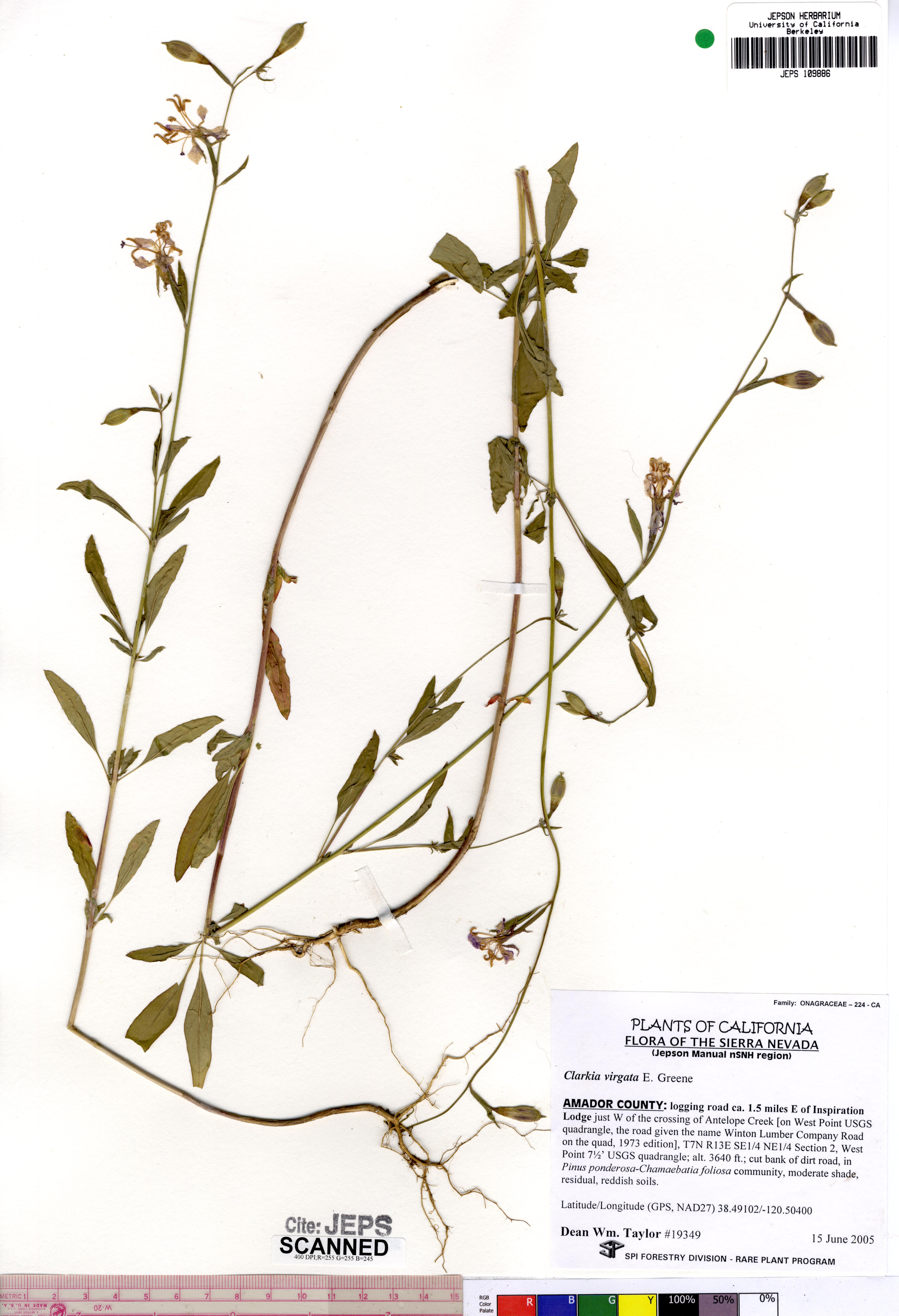
- Clarkia virgata

Conservation status
- Vulnerable (NatureServe)

Scientific classification
- Kingdom: Plantae
- Clade: Tracheophytes
- Clade: Angiosperms
- Clade: Eudicots
- Clade: Rosids
- Order: Myrtales
- Family: Onagraceae
- Genus: Clarkia
- Species: C. virgata

Binomial name
- Clarkia virgata Greene

= Clarkia virgata =

Species of flowering plant

Clarkia virgata is a species of flowering plant in the evening primrose family known by the common name Sierra clarkia. It is endemic to California, where it is known from the forests and woodlands of the Sierra Nevada.

== Description ==
This is an erect annual herb with oval-shaped leaves each a few centimeters long. The inflorescence produces opening flowers below several clusters of closed, hanging flower buds. The sepals all separate as the petals bloom. Each petal is up to about 1.5 centimeters long and lavender and white, speckled with reddish or purple. It has a diamond-shaped blade at the end of a lobed, narrow claw. There are 8 stamens each bearing a large anther with blue-gray pollen.
