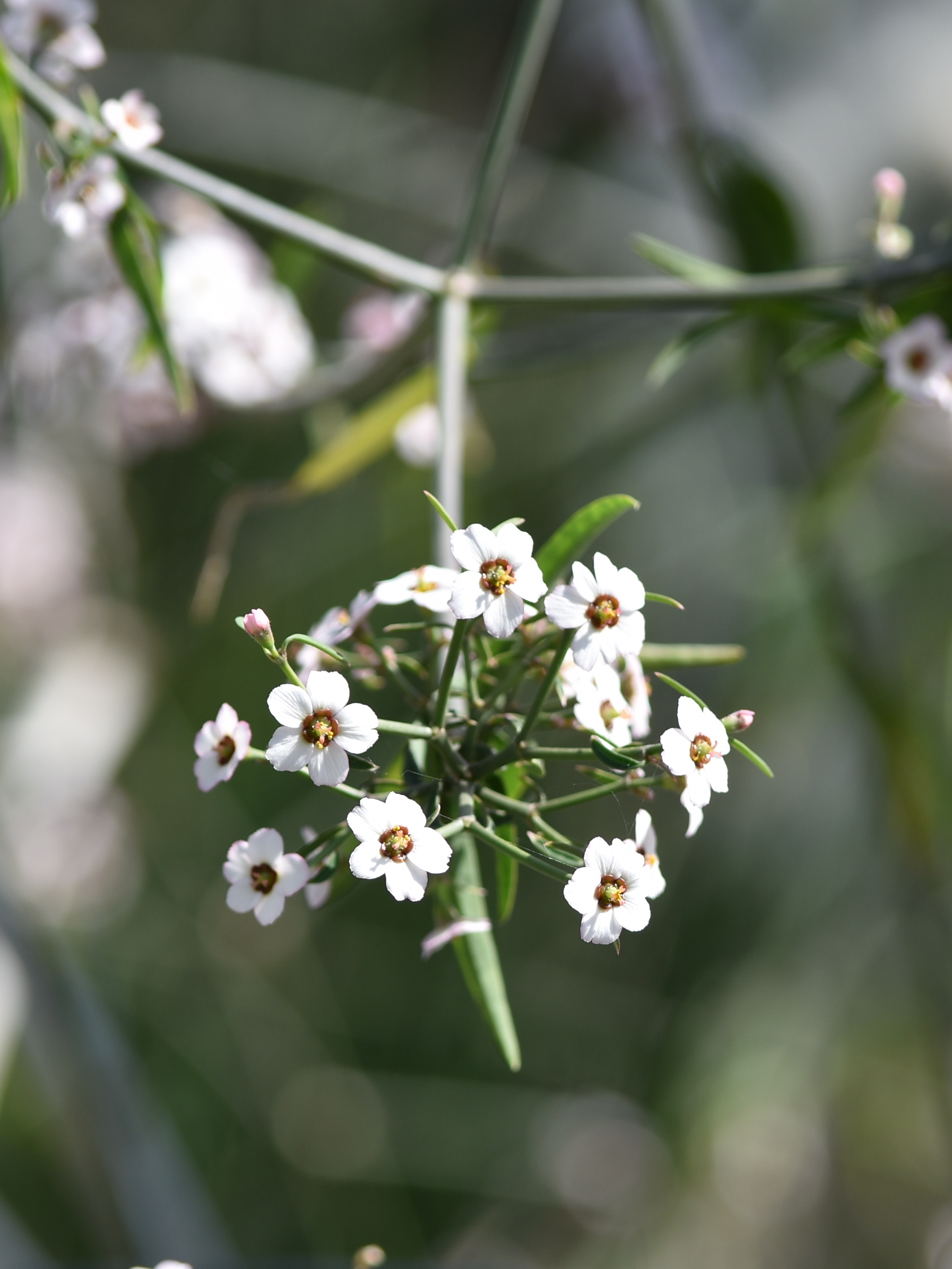
- CITES Appendix II

Scientific classification
- Kingdom: Plantae
- Clade: Embryophytes
- Clade: Tracheophytes
- Clade: Spermatophytes
- Clade: Angiosperms
- Clade: Eudicots
- Clade: Rosids
- Order: Malpighiales
- Family: Euphorbiaceae
- Genus: Euphorbia
- Species: E. xanti

Binomial name
- Euphorbia xanti Engelm. ex Boiss.

Synonyms
- Aklema xanti (Engelm. ex Boiss.) Millsp.; Euphorbia gymnoclada Engelm.; Euphorbia corallifera M.E.Jones

= Euphorbia xanti =

Species of flowering plant in the spurge family

Euphorbia xanti, known as Baja spurge, is a species of flowering plant in the spurge family Euphorbiaceae. It is native to Mexico, occurring in Baja California, Sonora, and Sinaloa. This species is a shrubby succulent, valued in gardening for drought tolerance and its abundant fragrant cyathia with colourful bracts. As most other succulent members of the genus Euphorbia, its trade is regulated under Appendix II of CITES.
