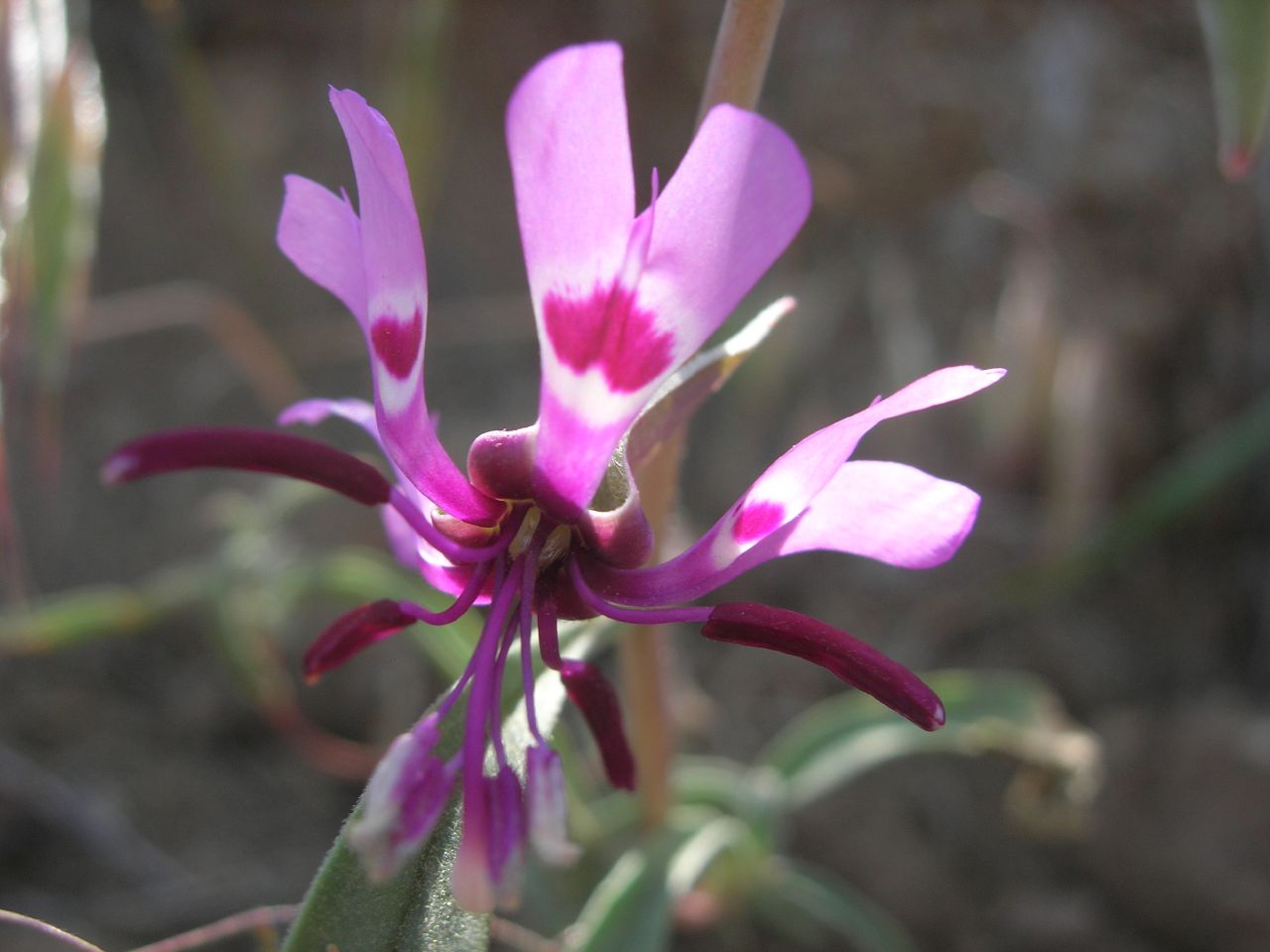

Scientific classification
- Kingdom: Plantae
- Clade: Tracheophytes
- Clade: Angiosperms
- Clade: Eudicots
- Clade: Rosids
- Order: Myrtales
- Family: Onagraceae
- Genus: Clarkia
- Species: C. xantiana

Binomial name
- Clarkia xantiana A.Gray

= Clarkia xantiana =

Species of flowering plant

Clarkia xantiana is a species of flowering plant in the evening primrose family known by the common name gunsight clarkia. It is endemic to California, where it is known from the southern Sierra Nevada and its foothills and the adjacent Transverse Ranges. This is an erect annual herb with linear to lance-shaped leaves each up to 6 centimeters long. The inflorescence produces opening flowers and closed buds. The sepals stay fused as the petals bloom from one side. Each petal is up to 2 centimeters long and generally light to medium purple in color, sometimes with a dark, ringed spot on the petals of the upper whorl. The petal has a narrow claw and a wider blade which has two lobes at the tip with a small tooth between.
