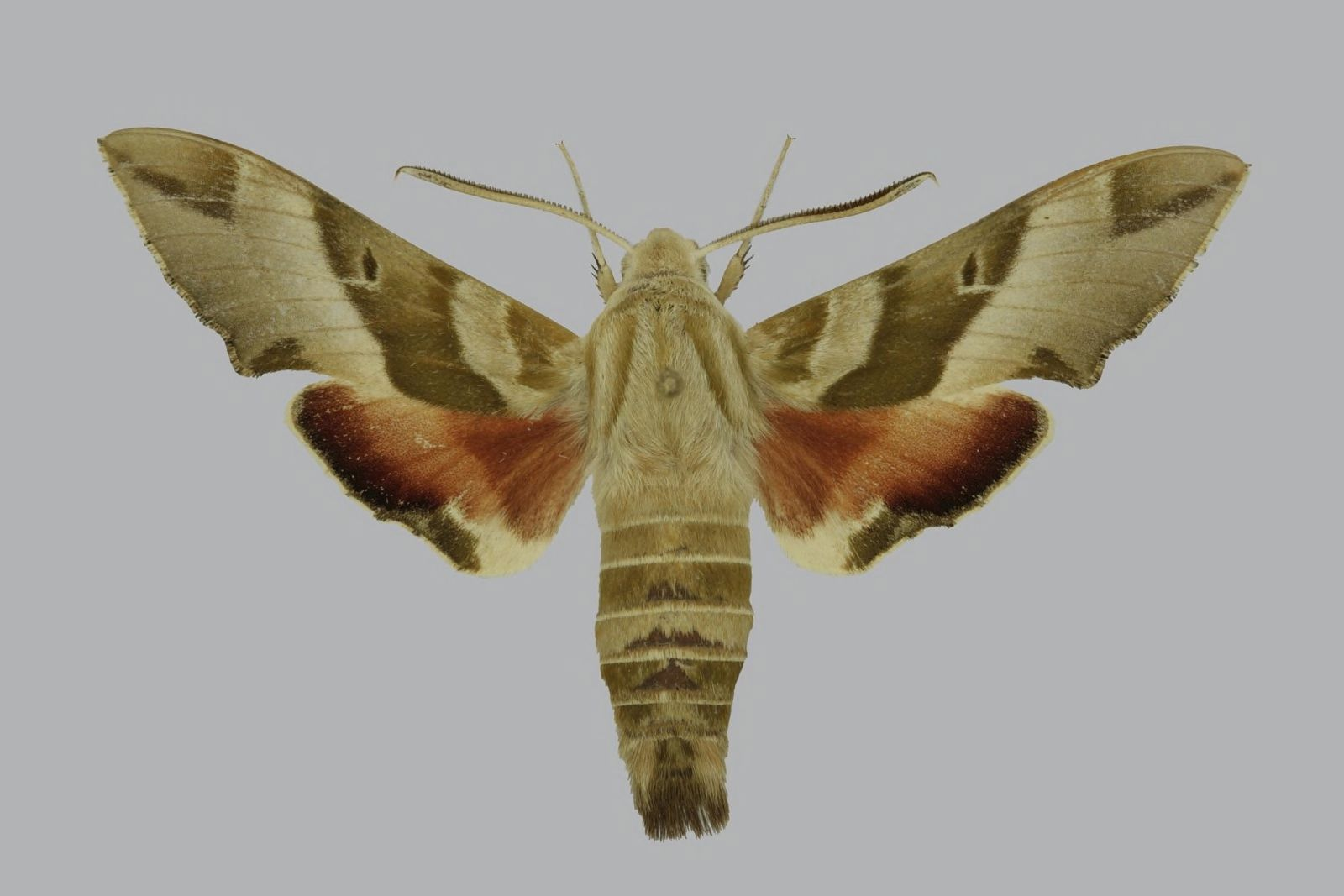

Scientific classification
- Domain: Eukaryota
- Kingdom: Animalia
- Phylum: Arthropoda
- Class: Insecta
- Order: Lepidoptera
- Family: Sphingidae
- Genus: Proserpinus
- Species: P. vega

Binomial name
- Proserpinus vega (Dyar, 1903)

Synonyms
- Lepisesia vega Dyar, 1903

= Proserpinus vega =

Vega sphinx moth

Species of moth

Proserpinus vega, the vega sphinx moth, is a moth of the family Sphingidae. The species was first described by Harrison Gray Dyar Jr. in 1903. It is found from southern Arizona, New Mexico and Texas south into Mexico.

The wingspan is 61–67 mm. The forewing upperside is similar to Proserpinus terlooii but with an additional dark green basal band. The hindwing upperside is as in Proserpinus juanita.

There is one generation per year with adults on wing in August. Adults fly during the afternoon, nectaring from flowers.

The larvae feed on Onagraceae species, including Oenothera, Gaura and Epilobium species.
