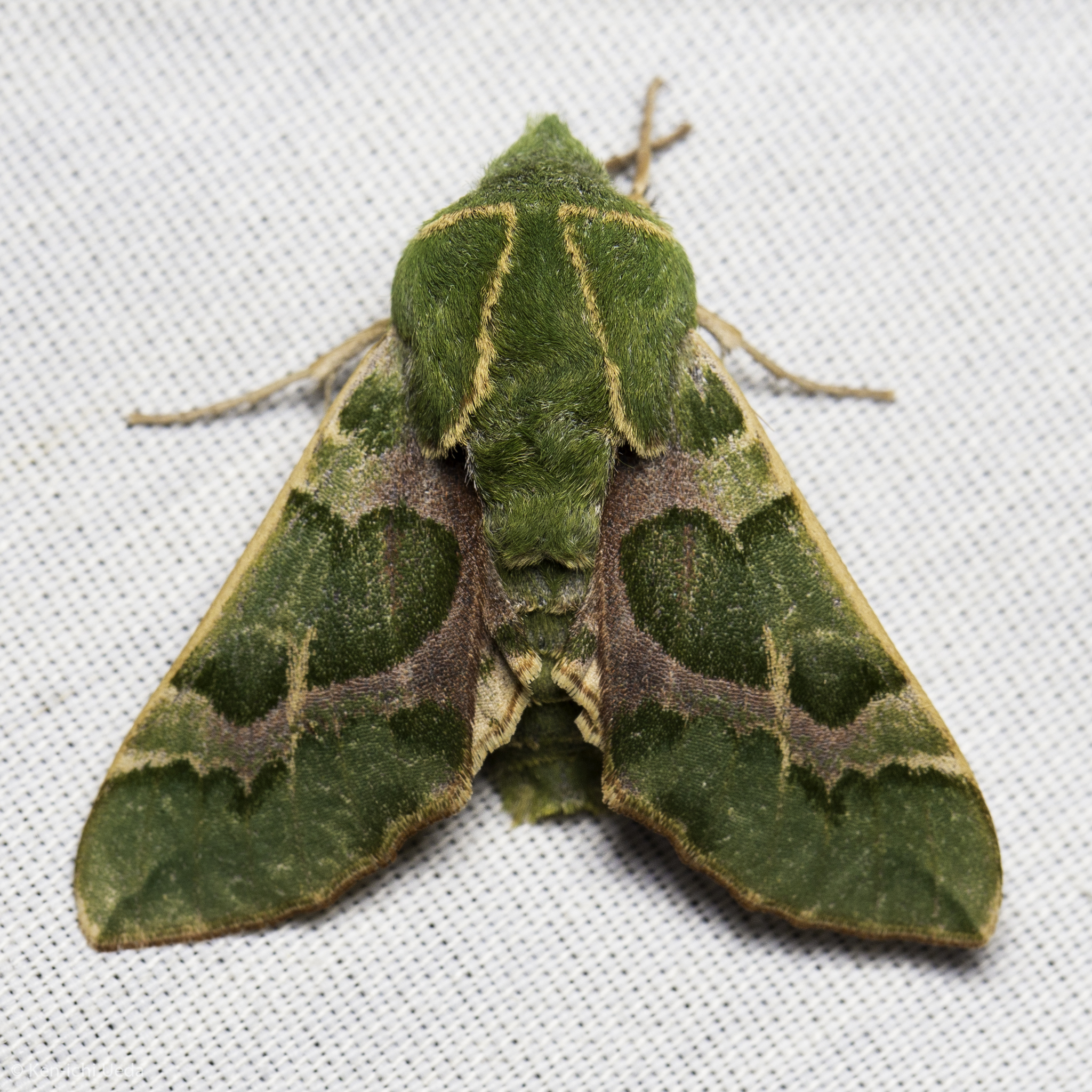
- Live adult attracted to a UV light

Scientific classification
- Kingdom: Animalia
- Phylum: Arthropoda
- Class: Insecta
- Order: Lepidoptera
- Family: Sphingidae
- Genus: Proserpinus
- Species: P. lucidus

Binomial name
- Proserpinus lucidus (Boisduval, 1852)

Synonyms
- Arctonotus lucidus Boisduval, 1852; Arctonotus lucidus clarki Barnes & Benjamin, 1923

= Proserpinus lucidus =

Pacific green sphinx

Species of moth

Proserpinus lucidus, the Pacific green sphinx or bear sphinx, is a moth of the family Sphingidae first described by Jean Baptiste Boisduval in 1852.

== Distribution ==
It lives on the Pacific coast of the United States in Washington, Idaho, Oregon and California.

== Description ==
The green forewings are 22–23 mm long, with pink/purple transverse bands outlined in yellow.

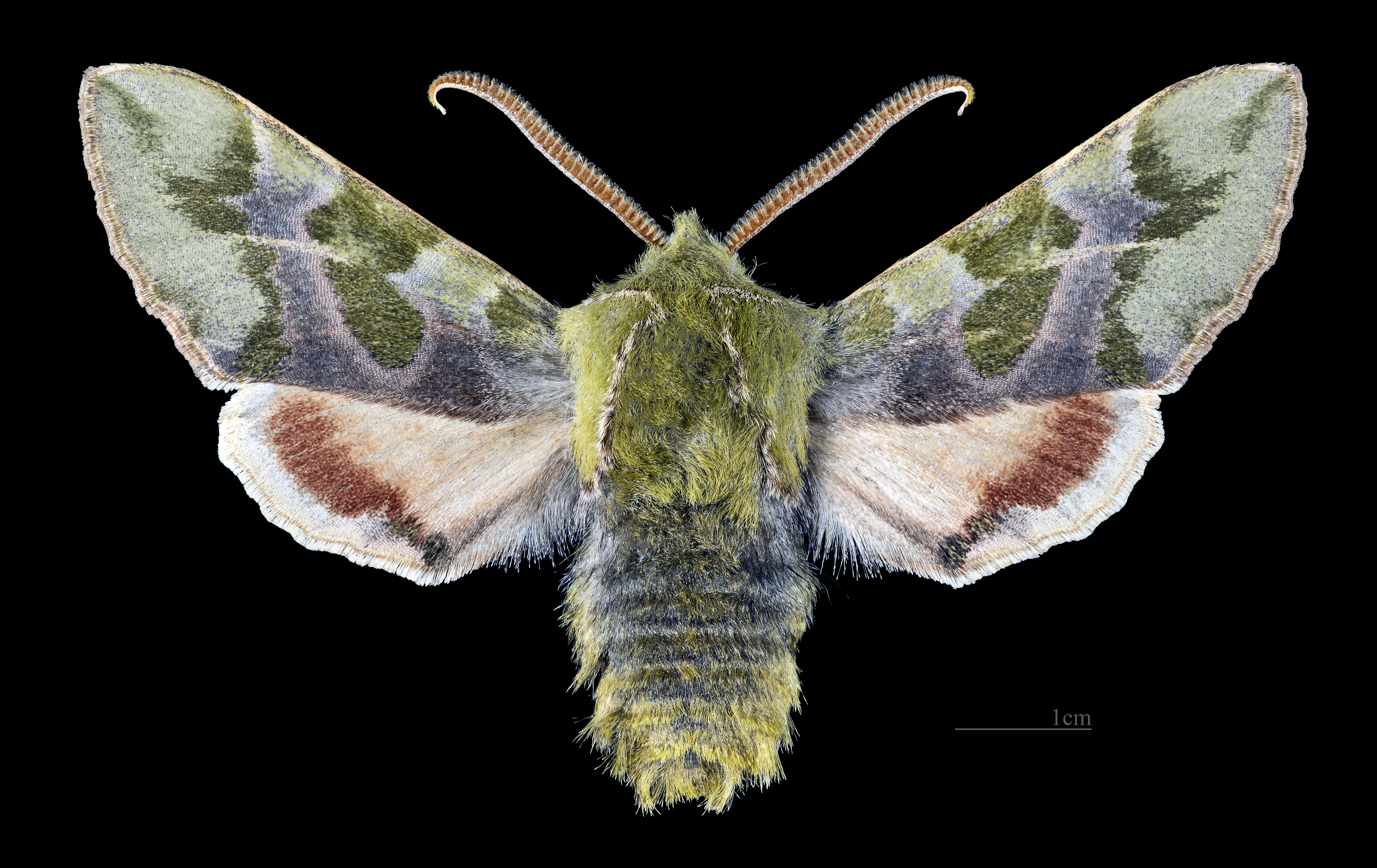
Male upperside

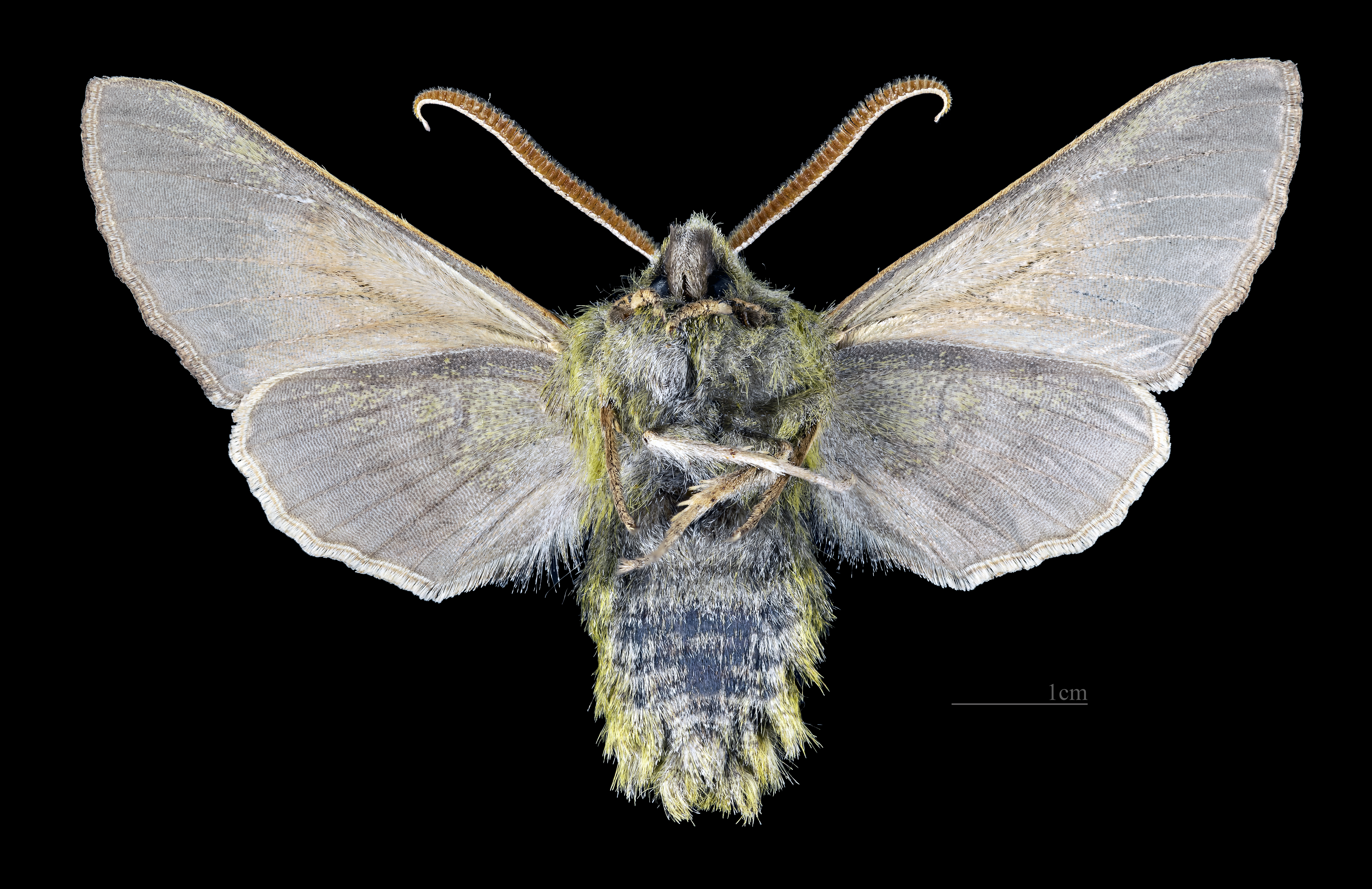
Male underside

== Biology ==
Adults fly in one generation in winter, from December to April, during which they do not eat. They are attracted to lights, but normally females will remain stationary and emit a pheromone to attract males.

The larvae feed on Clarkia breweri and Clarkia modesta and probably Clarkia purpurea, Camissonia bistorta and Camissonia strigulosa. In later instars they lose the horn that characterizes most sphinx moth caterpillars, and instead have a "bullseye" spot. The caterpillars can reach 5 cm.

The caterpillars begin to pupate four to five weeks after hatching. They will pupate under leaf litter or burrow up to 16.5 cm down into the root mass of their host plants, and wait until next winter to eclose (emerge).
