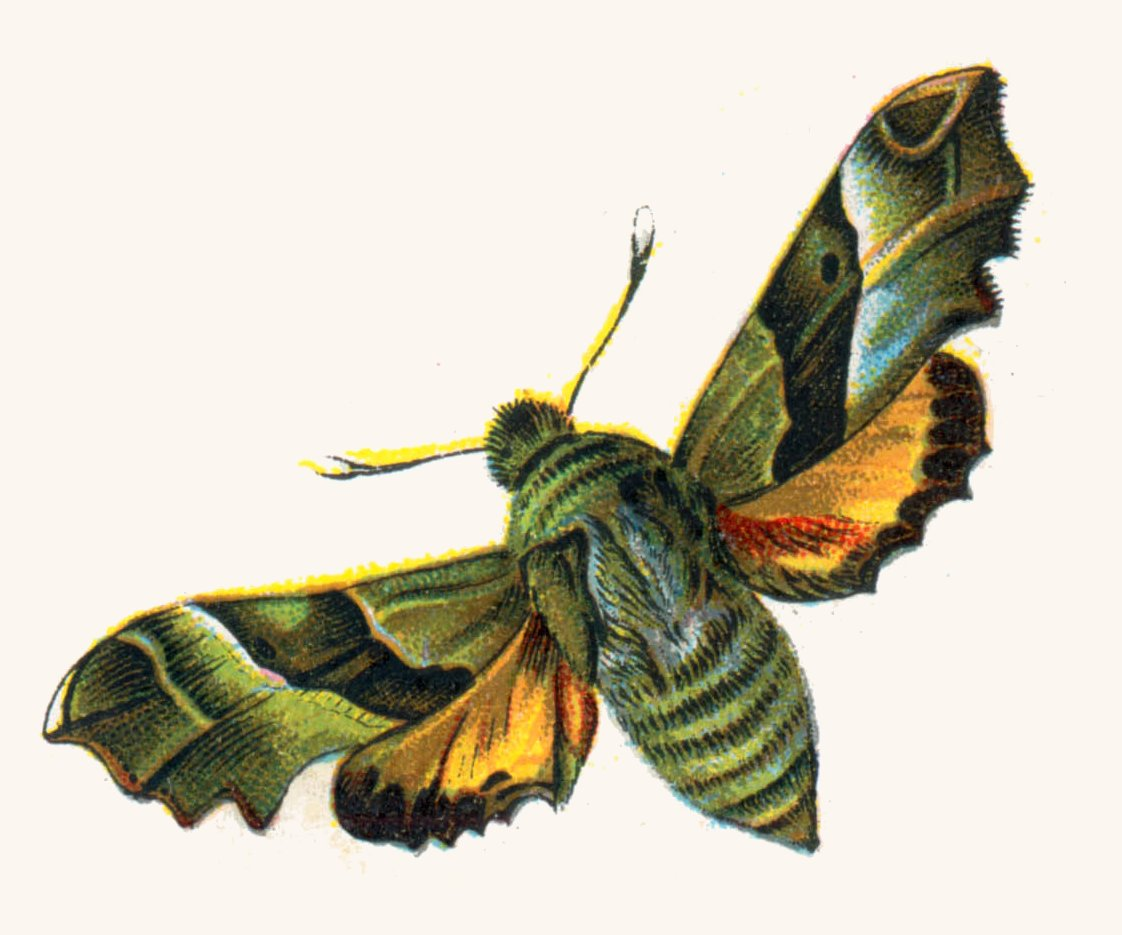
- Proserpinus proserpina

Scientific classification
- Domain: Eukaryota
- Kingdom: Animalia
- Phylum: Arthropoda
- Class: Insecta
- Order: Lepidoptera
- Family: Sphingidae
- Subtribe: Macroglossina
- Genus: Proserpinus; Hübner, 1819

Synonyms
- Arctonotus Boisduval, 1852; Dieneces Butler, 1881; Lepisesia Grote, 1865; Pogocolon Boisduval, 1875; Pterogon Boisduval, 1828; Pteropogon Meigen, 1829

= Proserpinus =

Genus of moths

Proserpinus is a genus of moths in the family Sphingidae, the sphinx moths or hawk moths. Species of the genus are native to North America with the exception of P. proserpinus, which has a much larger range extending from Asia to Africa. The genus was erected by Jacob Hübner in 1819.

In general, these moths are green with orange or red hindwings. Like many other hawk moths, they hover in front of flowers like hummingbirds to feed on nectar. The larvae specialize on plants of the evening primrose family, Onagraceae. Exceptions are P. flavofaciata, which has a black and yellow coloration, and P. terlooii, which feeds on spiderlings, plants of the four o'clock family, Nyctaginaceae.

There are seven species. Arctonotus lucidus may be included as P. lucidus.

Species include:

- Proserpinus clarkiae (Boisduval, 1852) – Clark's day sphinx
- Proserpinus flavofasciata Walker, 1856 – yellow-banded day sphinx
- Proserpinus gaurae (J. E. Smith, 1797) – proud sphinx
- Proserpinus juanita (Strecker, 1876)
- Proserpinus lucidus Boisduval, 1852 (syn. Arctonotus lucidus)
- Proserpinus proserpina (Pallas, 1772) – willowherb hawkmoth
- Proserpinus terlooii W. H. Edwards, 1875 – Terloo's sphinx
- Proserpinus vega (Dyar, 1903) – vega sphinx

== Gallery ==
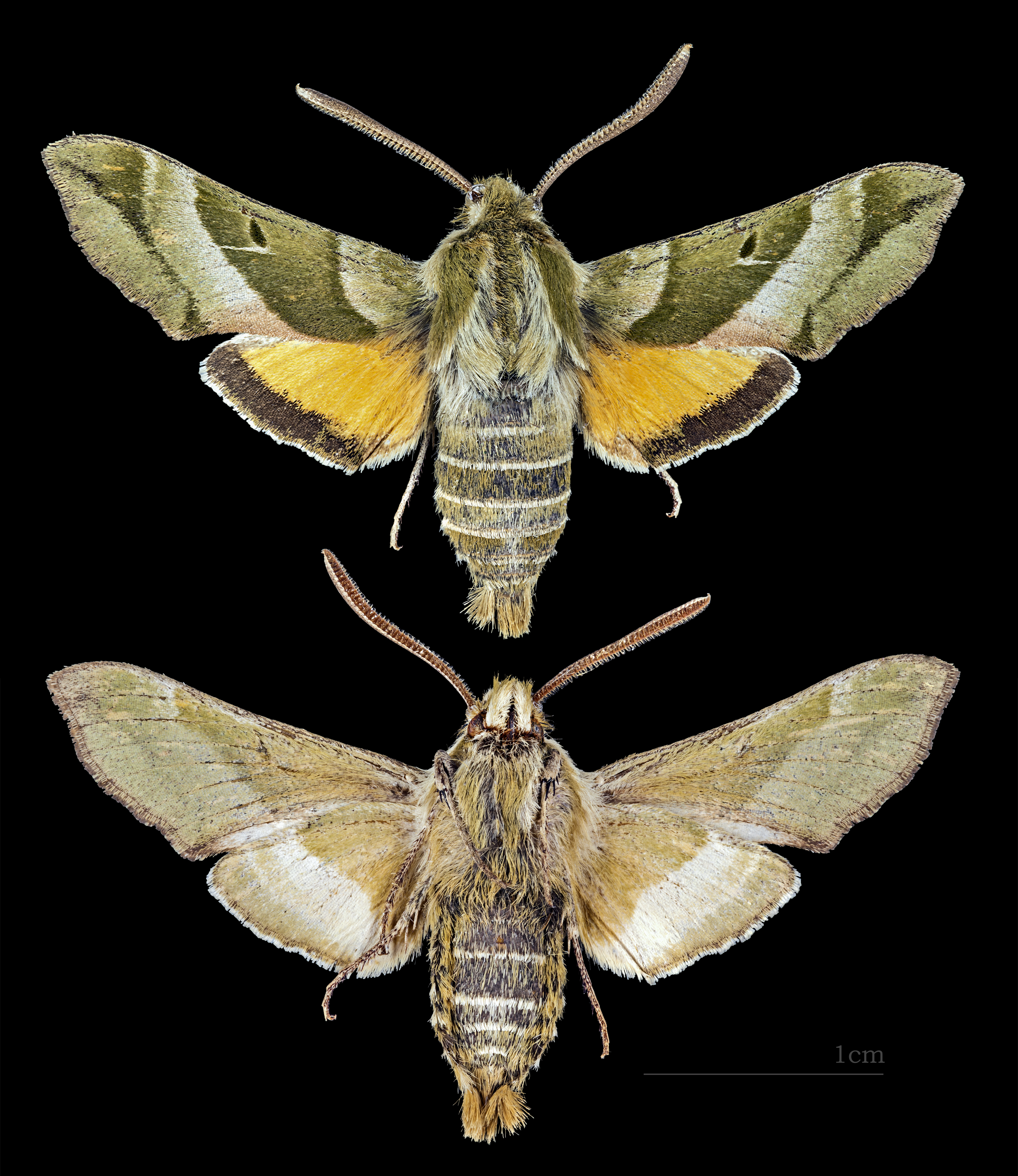
Proserpinus clarkiae

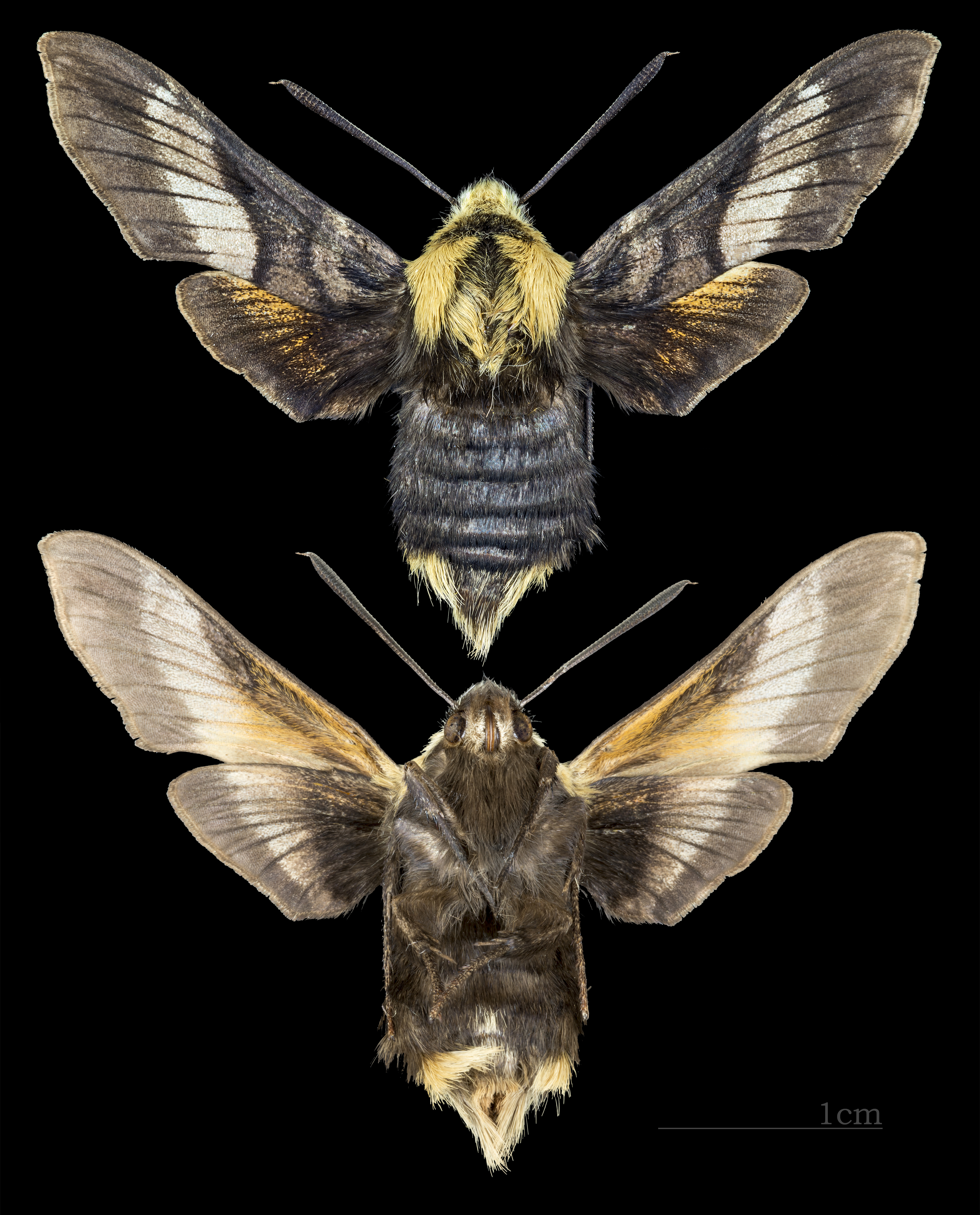
Proserpinus flavofasciata

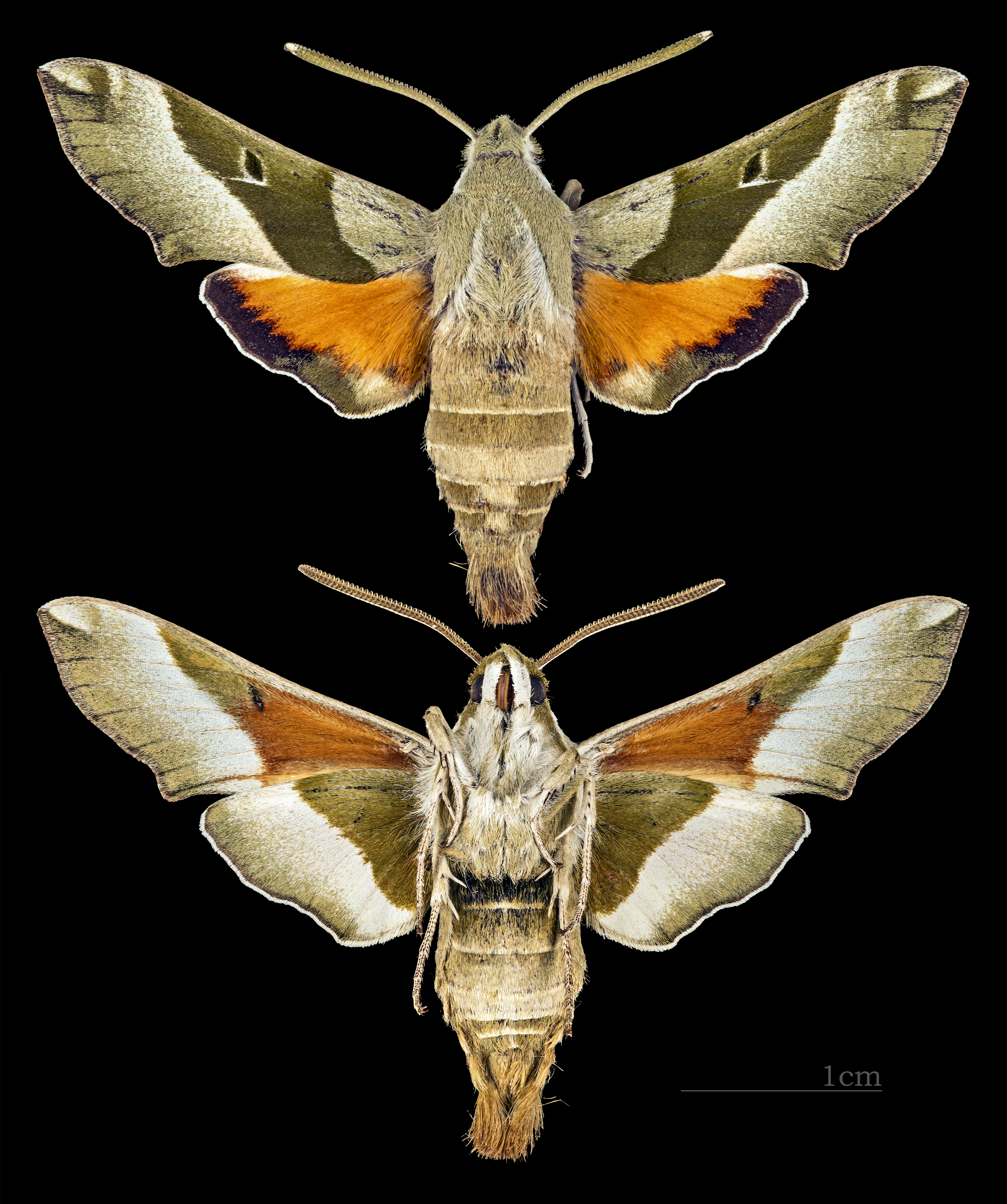
Proserpinus juanita

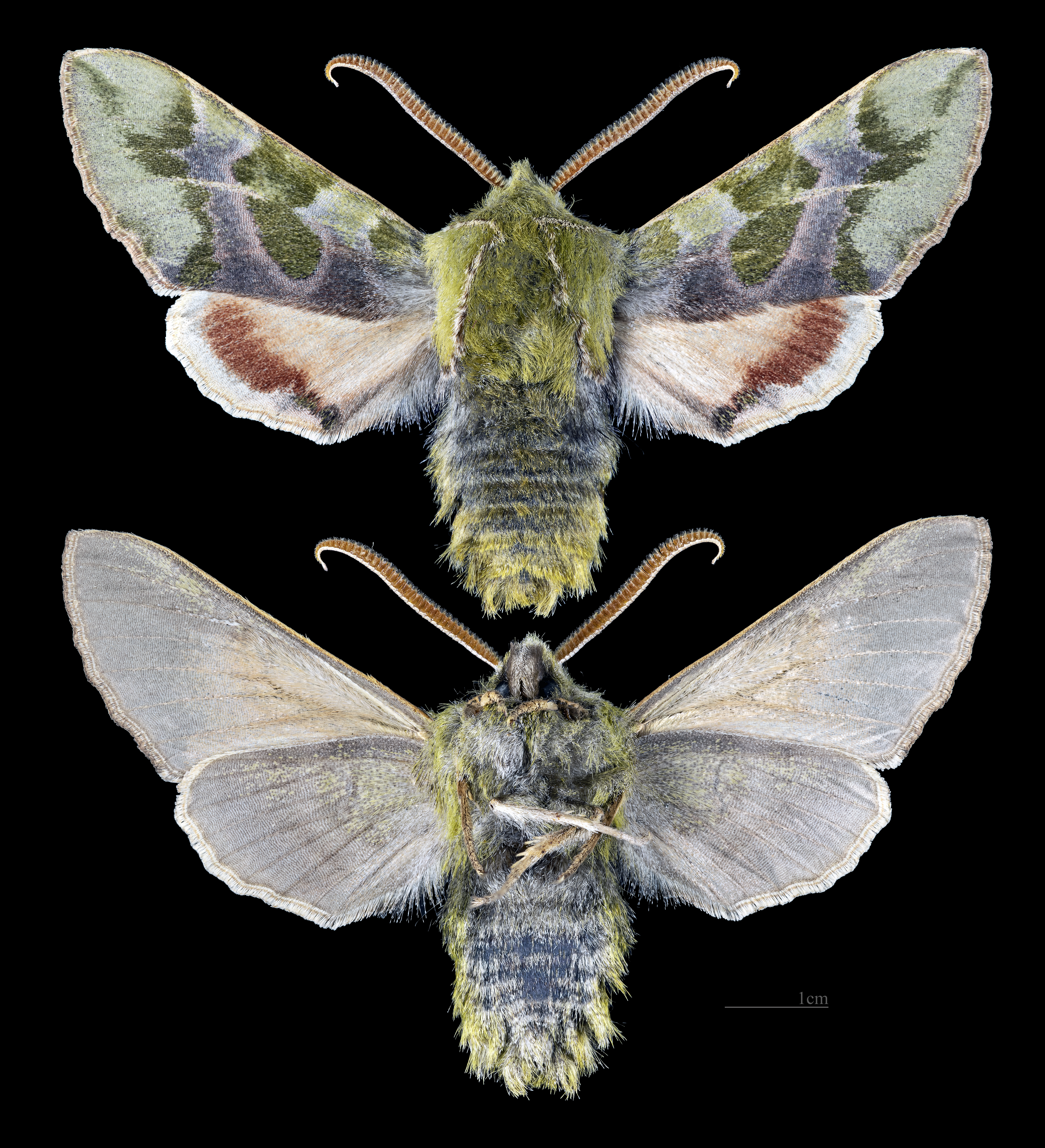
Proserpinus lucidus

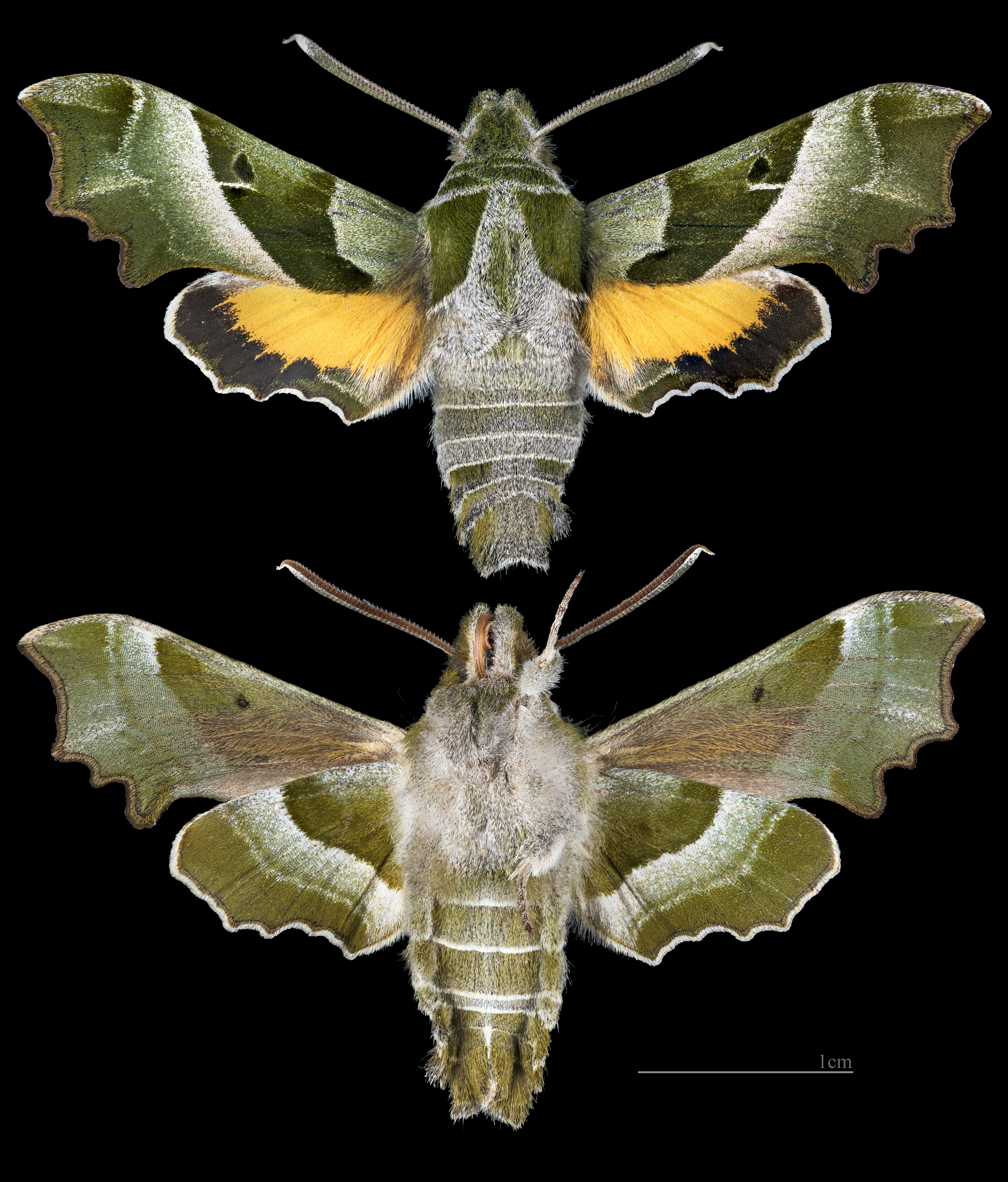
Proserpinus proserpina
