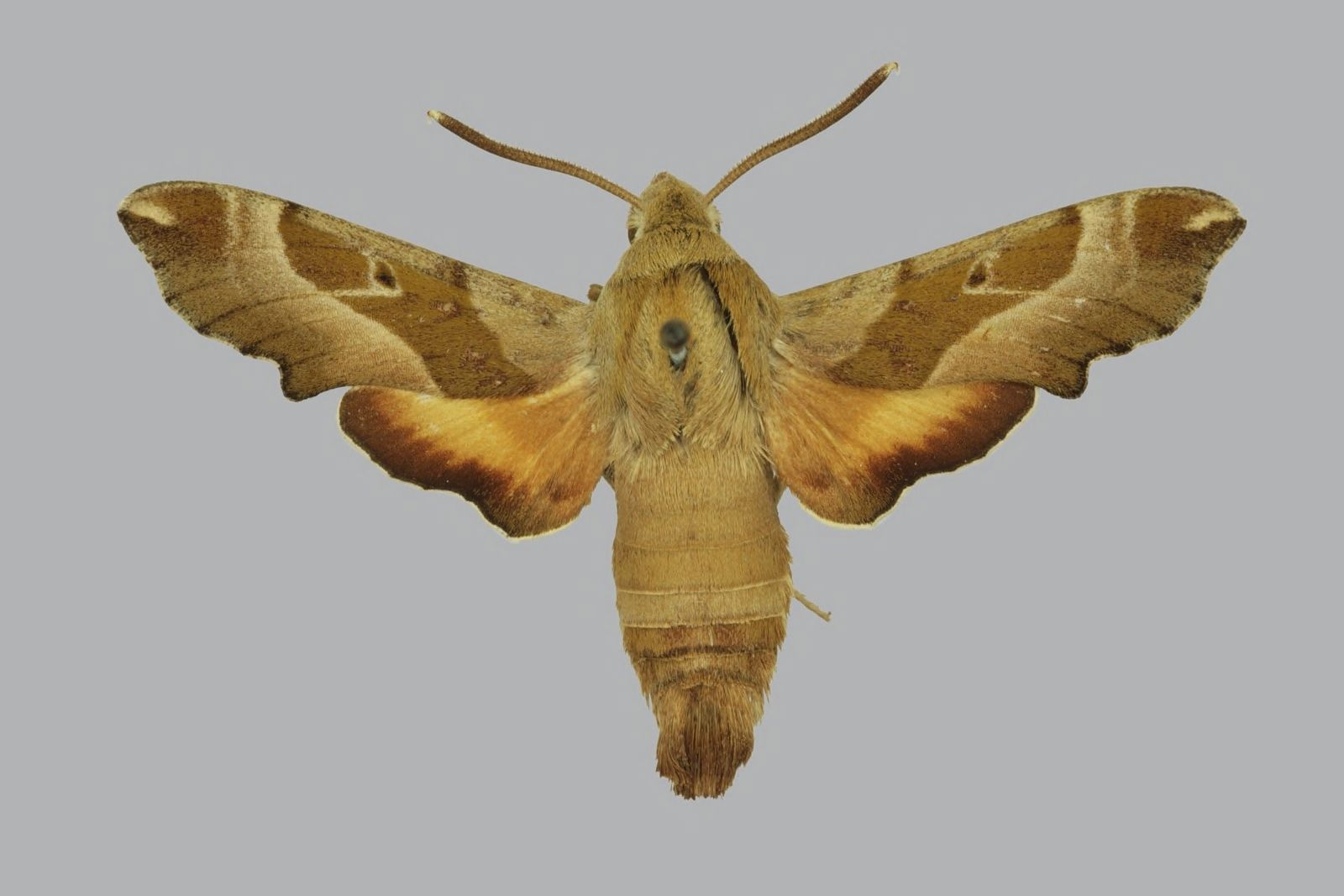

Scientific classification
- Kingdom: Animalia
- Phylum: Arthropoda
- Class: Insecta
- Order: Lepidoptera
- Family: Sphingidae
- Genus: Proserpinus
- Species: P. gaurae

Binomial name
- Proserpinus gaurae (J. E. Smith, 1797)

Synonyms
- Sphinx gaurae J. E. Smith, 1797; Proserpinus circae Edwards, 1882; Proserpinus deceptiva Barnes & Benjamin, 1924

= Proserpinus gaurae =

Proud sphinx moth

Species of moth

Proserpinus gaurae, the proud sphinx moth, is a moth of the family Sphingidae. The species was first described by James Edward Smith in 1797. It is found from Texas and Louisiana east to northern Florida, north to Alabama, Missouri, northern Georgia and South Carolina. It may range as far south as northern Mexico.

The wingspan is 45–48 mm. The forewing outer margin is distinctly sinuate before the tornus. The labial palps are longer than in any other Proserpinus species and somewhat projecting. The underside of the abdomen is brownish orange. The forewing underside has no black discal spot. The basal area is chestnut orange. The hindwing upperside is orange, but washed brownish basally. The marginal band is reddish and the fringe is white with the short scales black. The basal area of the hindwing underside is chestnut orange.

There are probably one or two generations per year with adults on wing from April to August.

The larvae feed on Oenothera, Gaura and Epilobium species. Full-grown larvae pupate and overwinter in shallow burrows.
