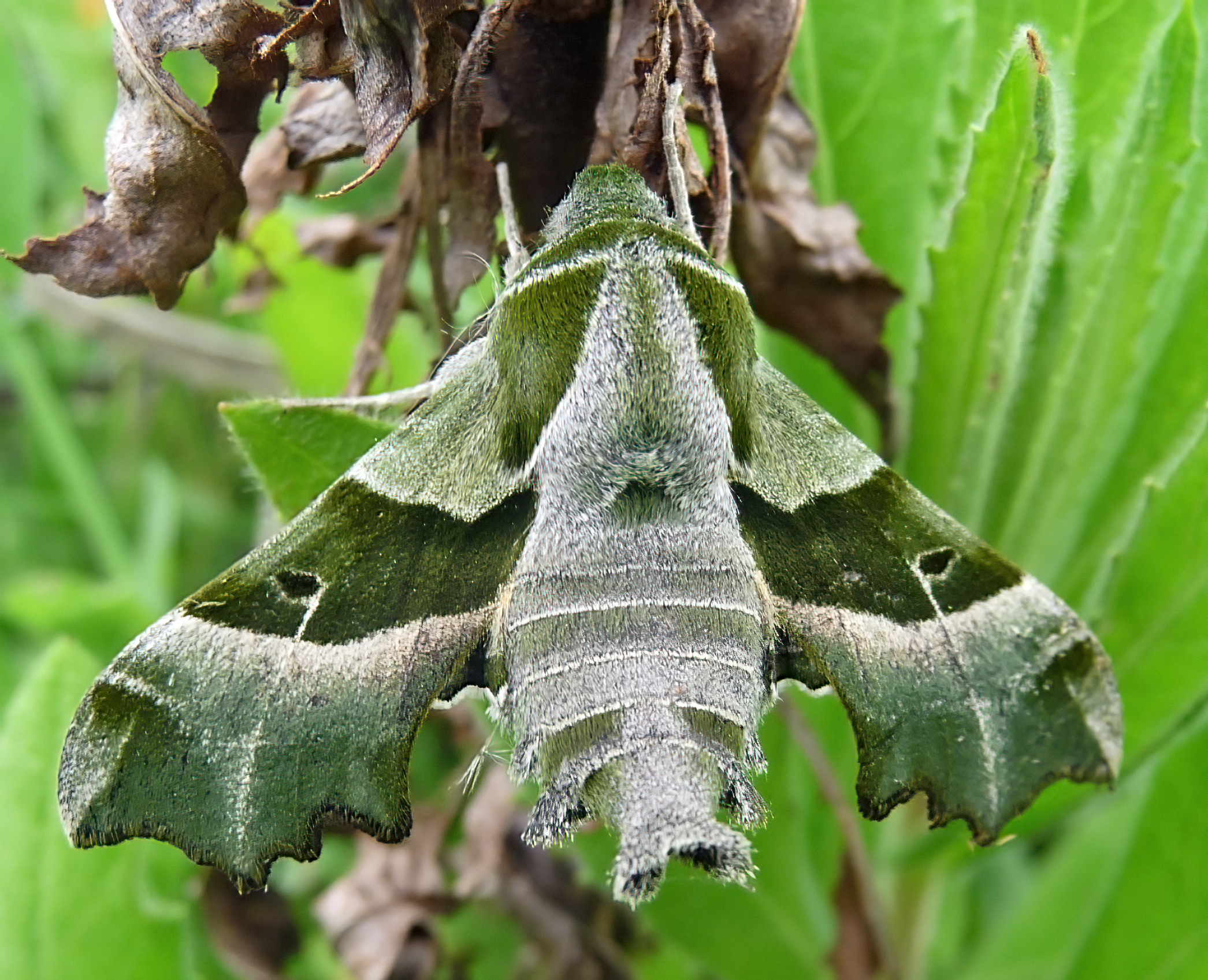

Conservation status
- Data Deficient (IUCN 2.3)

Scientific classification
- Kingdom: Animalia
- Phylum: Arthropoda
- Clade: Pancrustacea
- Class: Insecta
- Order: Lepidoptera
- Family: Sphingidae
- Genus: Proserpinus
- Species: P. proserpina

Binomial name
- Proserpinus proserpina (Pallas, 1772)
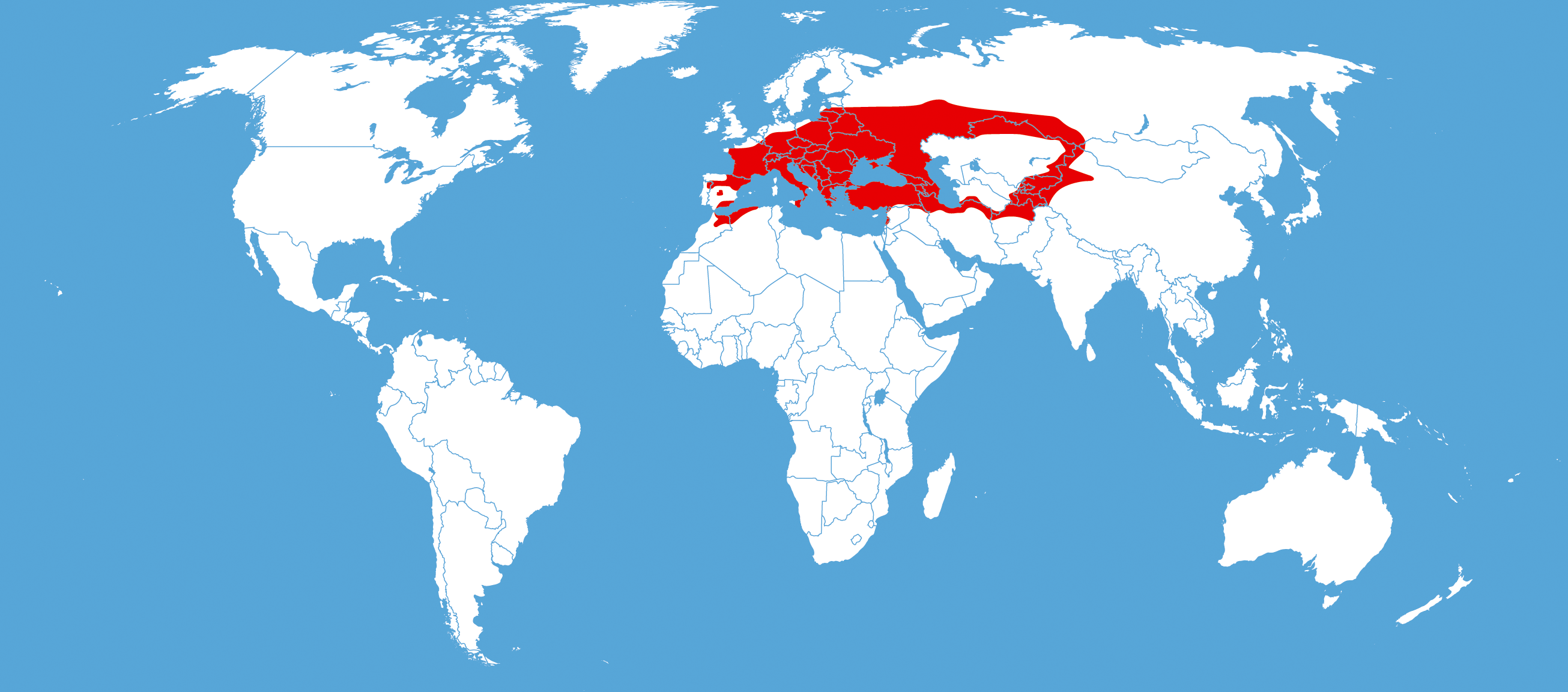

Synonyms
- Sphynx proserpina Pallas, 1772; Sphinx schieffermilleri Fuessly, 1779; Sphinx oenotherae Denis & Schiffermüller, 1775; Sphinx francofurtana Fabricius, 1781; Proserpinus aenotheroides Butler, 1876; Proserpinus proserpina attenuata Schultz, 1904; Proserpinus proserpina brunnea Geest, 1903; Proserpinus proserpina grisea Rebel, 1910; Proserpinus proserpina infumata (Closs, 1911); Proserpinus proserpina schmidti Schmidt, 1914; Pterogon proserpina gigas Oberthür, 1922; Pterogon proserpina japetus Grum-Grshimailo, 1890; Pterogon proserpina maxima Grum-Grshimailo, 1887

= Willowherb hawkmoth =

Species of moth

The willowherb hawkmoth (Proserpinus proserpina) is a moth in the family Sphingidae. The species was first described by Peter Simon Pallas in 1772.

== Distribution ==
It is found in Armenia, Austria, Azerbaijan, Belgium, Bulgaria, Czech republic, Denmark, France, Germany, Greece, Hungary, Iran, Iraq, Italy, Kazakhstan, Lebanon, Morocco, Netherlands, Palestine, Portugal, Poland, Spain, Switzerland, Syria, Turkey, Turkmenistan, Ukraine, Uzbekistan, and Bosnia and Herzegovina.

== Description ==
The wingspan is 36–60 mm.

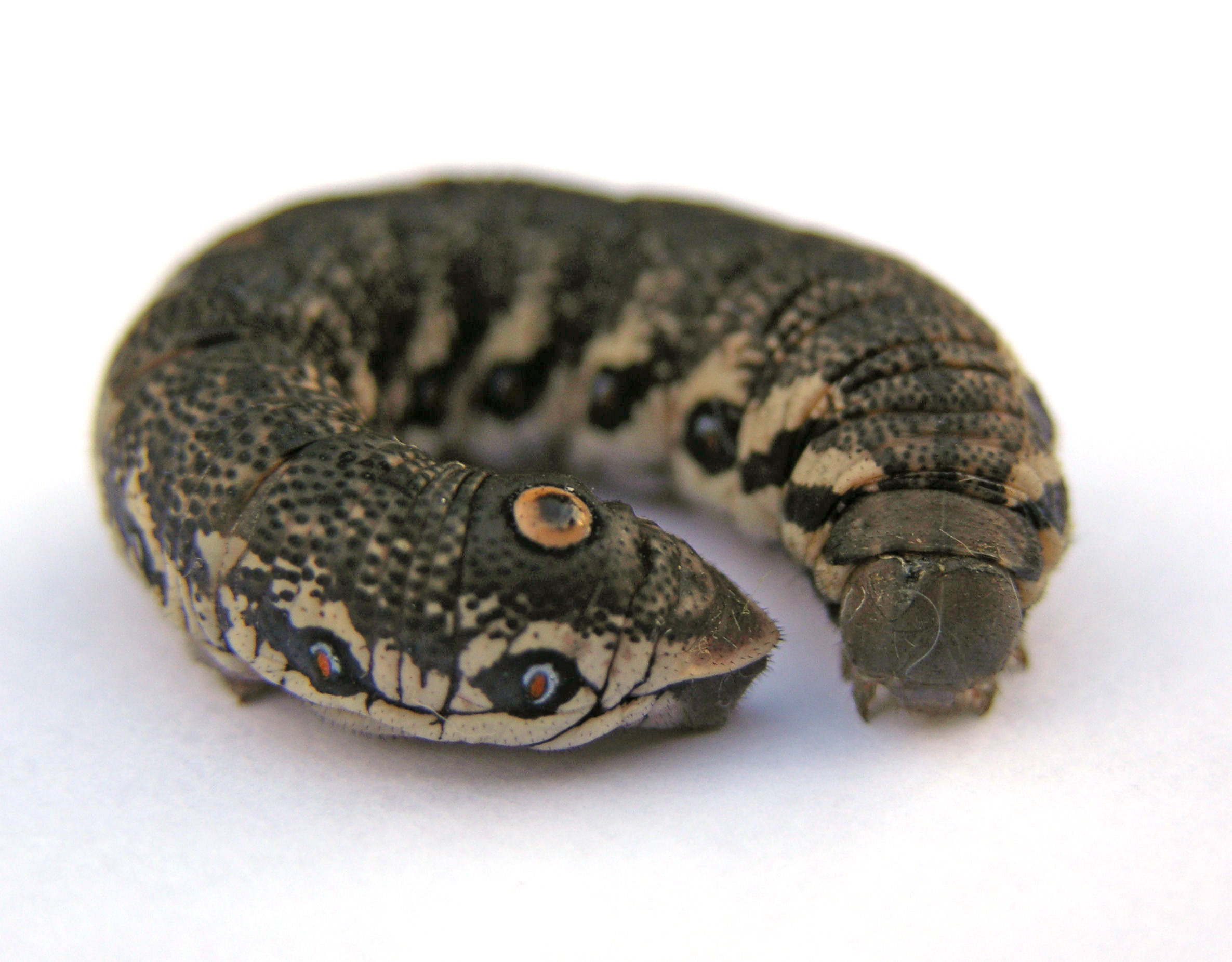
Caterpillar

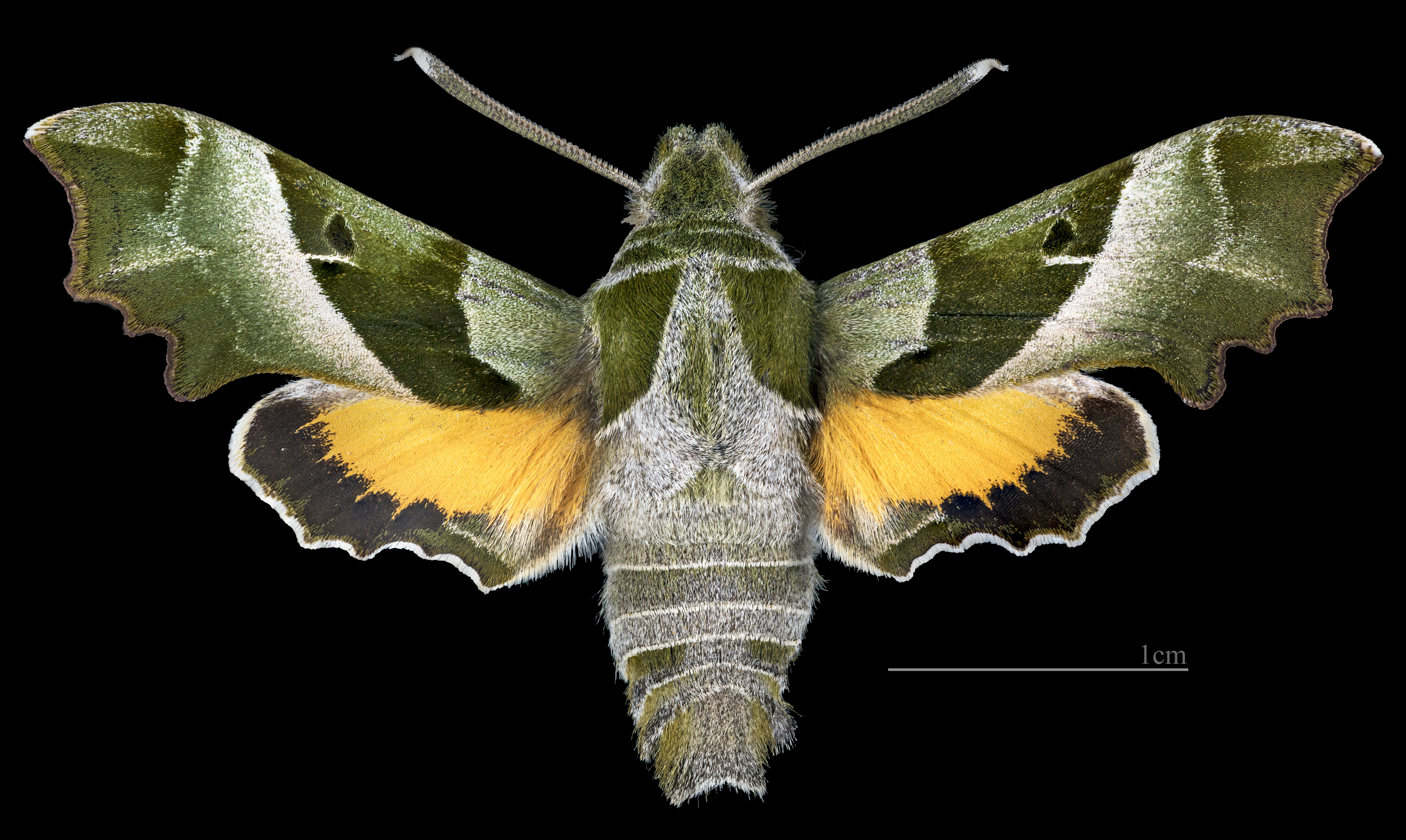
Proserpinus proserpina ♂

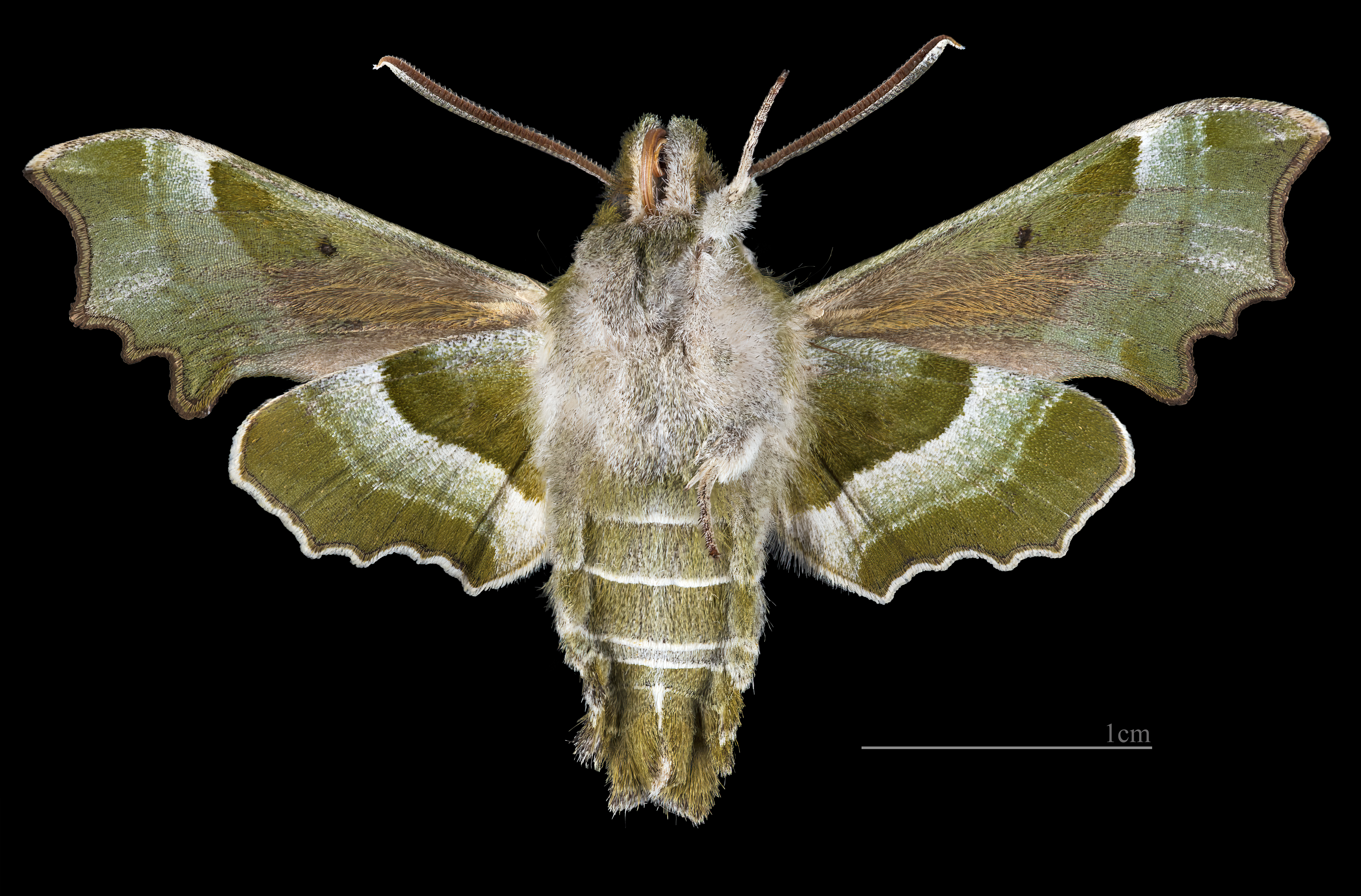
Proserpinus proserpina ♂ △

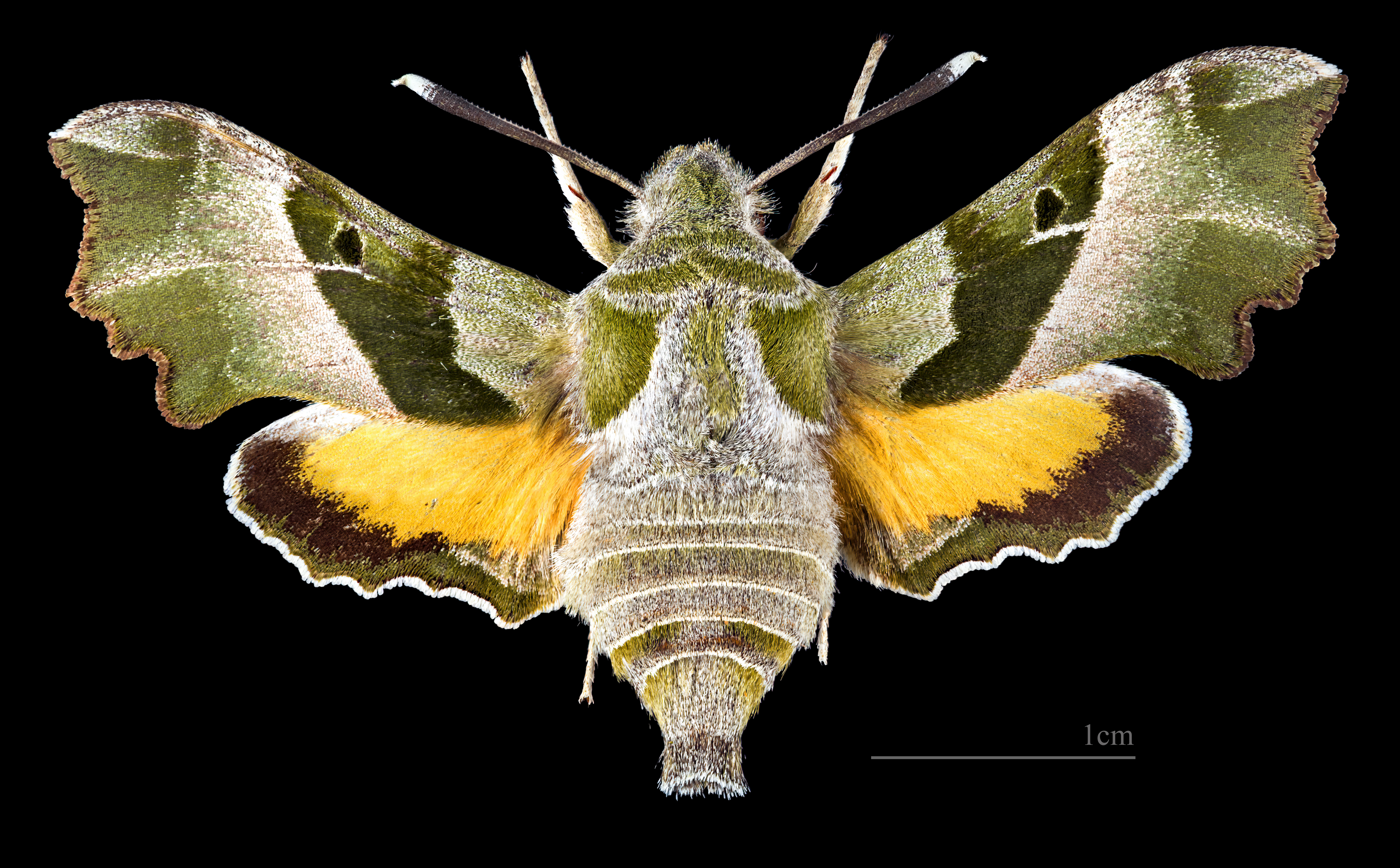
Proserpinus proserpina ♀

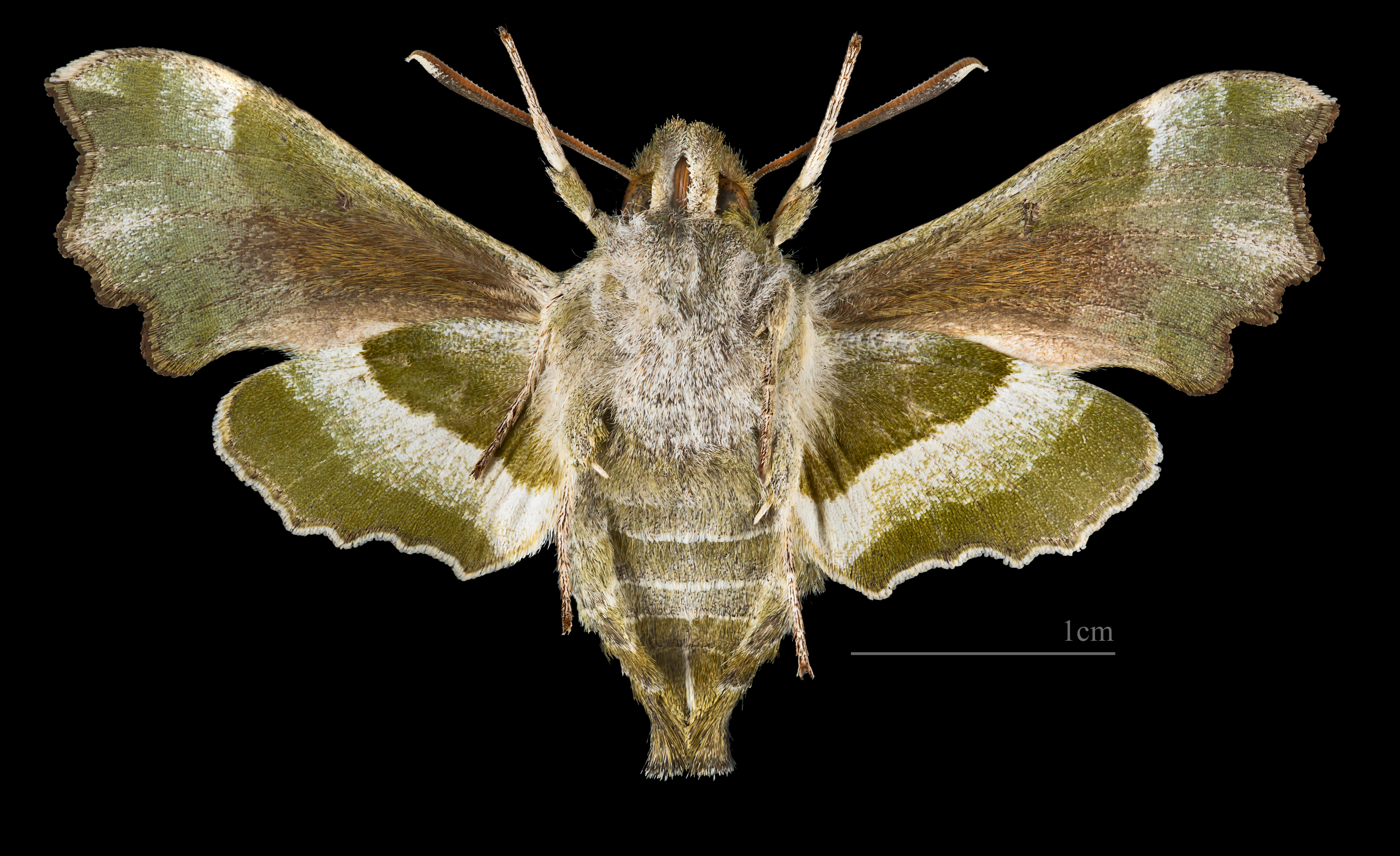
Proserpinus proserpina ♀ △

== Biology ==
The larvae feed on Epilobium (including Epilobium hirsutum), Oenothera and Lythrum species.
