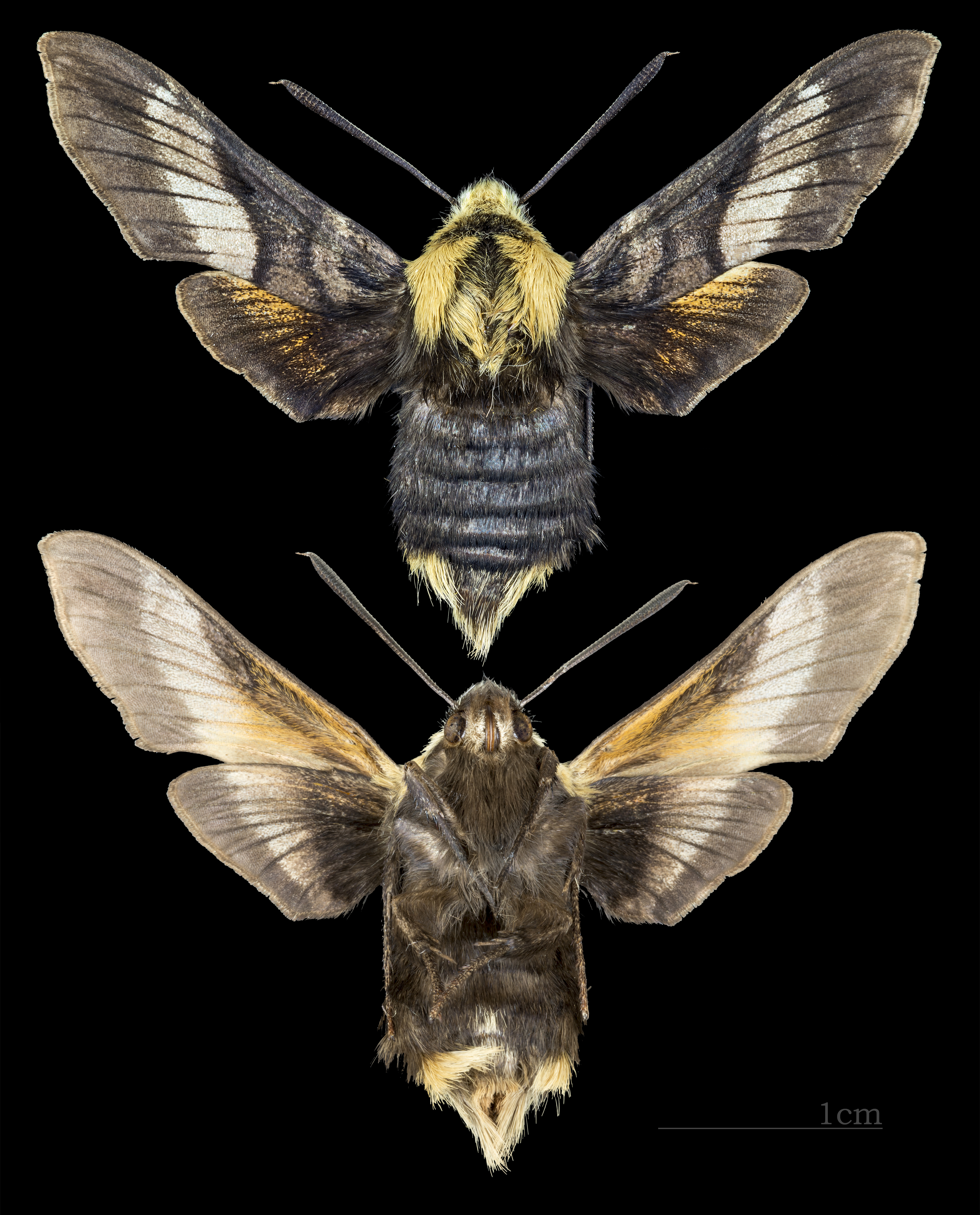

Scientific classification
- Domain: Eukaryota
- Kingdom: Animalia
- Phylum: Arthropoda
- Class: Insecta
- Order: Lepidoptera
- Family: Sphingidae
- Genus: Proserpinus
- Species: P. flavofasciata

Binomial name
- Proserpinus flavofasciata (Walker, 1856)

Synonyms
- Macroglossa flavofasciata Walker, 1856; Macroglossa ulalume Strecker, [1878]; Lepisesia ulalume var. rachel Bruce, 1901

= Proserpinus flavofasciata =

Yellow-banded day sphinx

Species of moth

Proserpinus flavofasciata, the yellow-banded day sphinx, is a species of hawk moth which occurs at the edges of, and in clearings in, boreal and mountain forests across Canada, as far south as Maine and Massachusetts in the east and as far north as Alaska in the west. It is much more common in the west of its range.

== Description ==
The adult moth is a day-flying bumblebee mimic with a plump black body with yellow markings. The black forewings are marked with a pale band and the hindwings, also black, have a prominent yellow band. It flies in late spring and early summer.

The larva develops through several instars which are dramatically different in appearance. The penultimate instar is pale green with two pale stripes along the sides with a short horn at the tail end. The last instar is brown with black spots and no longer has a horn, just a white-edged black button.

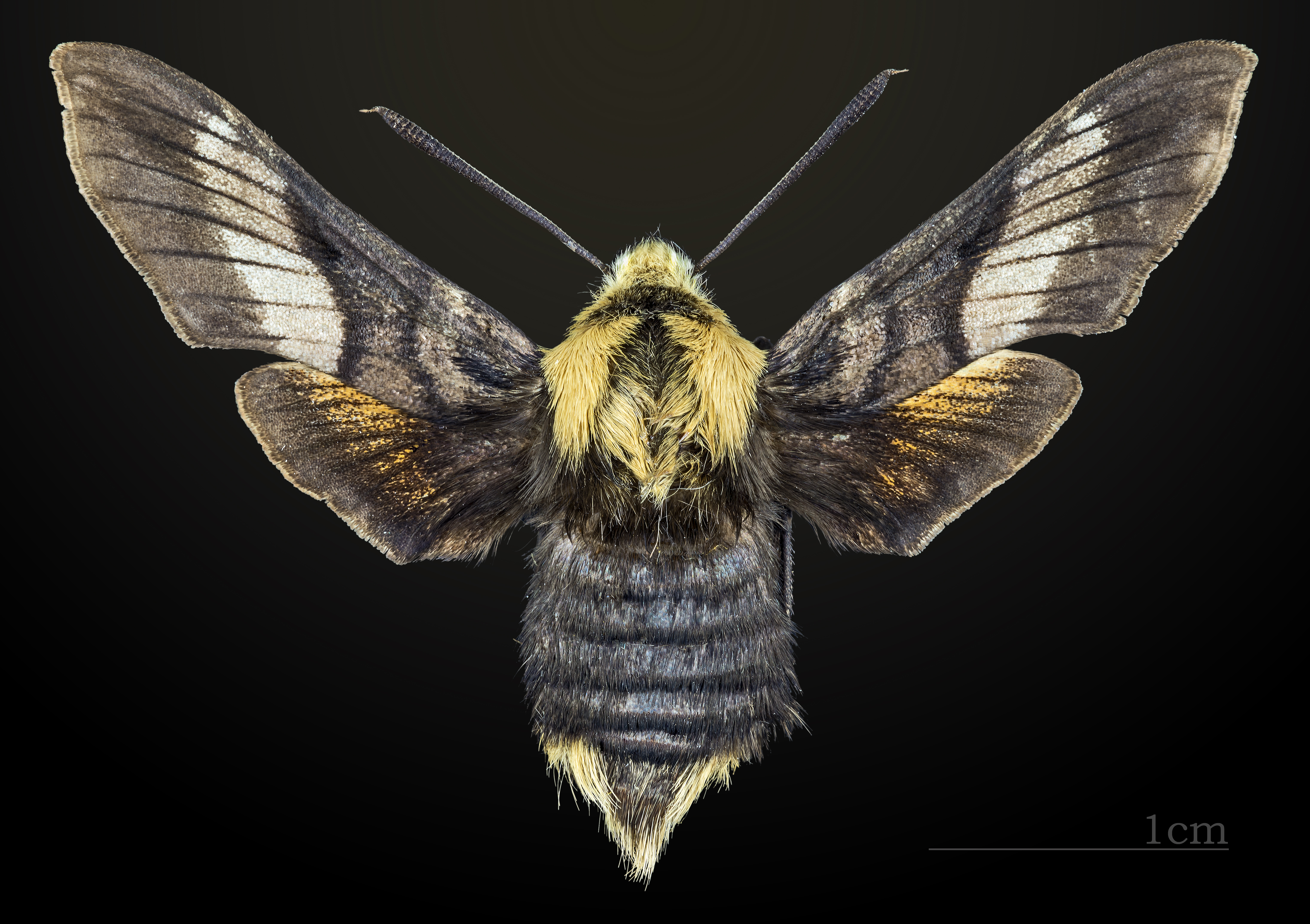
dorsal

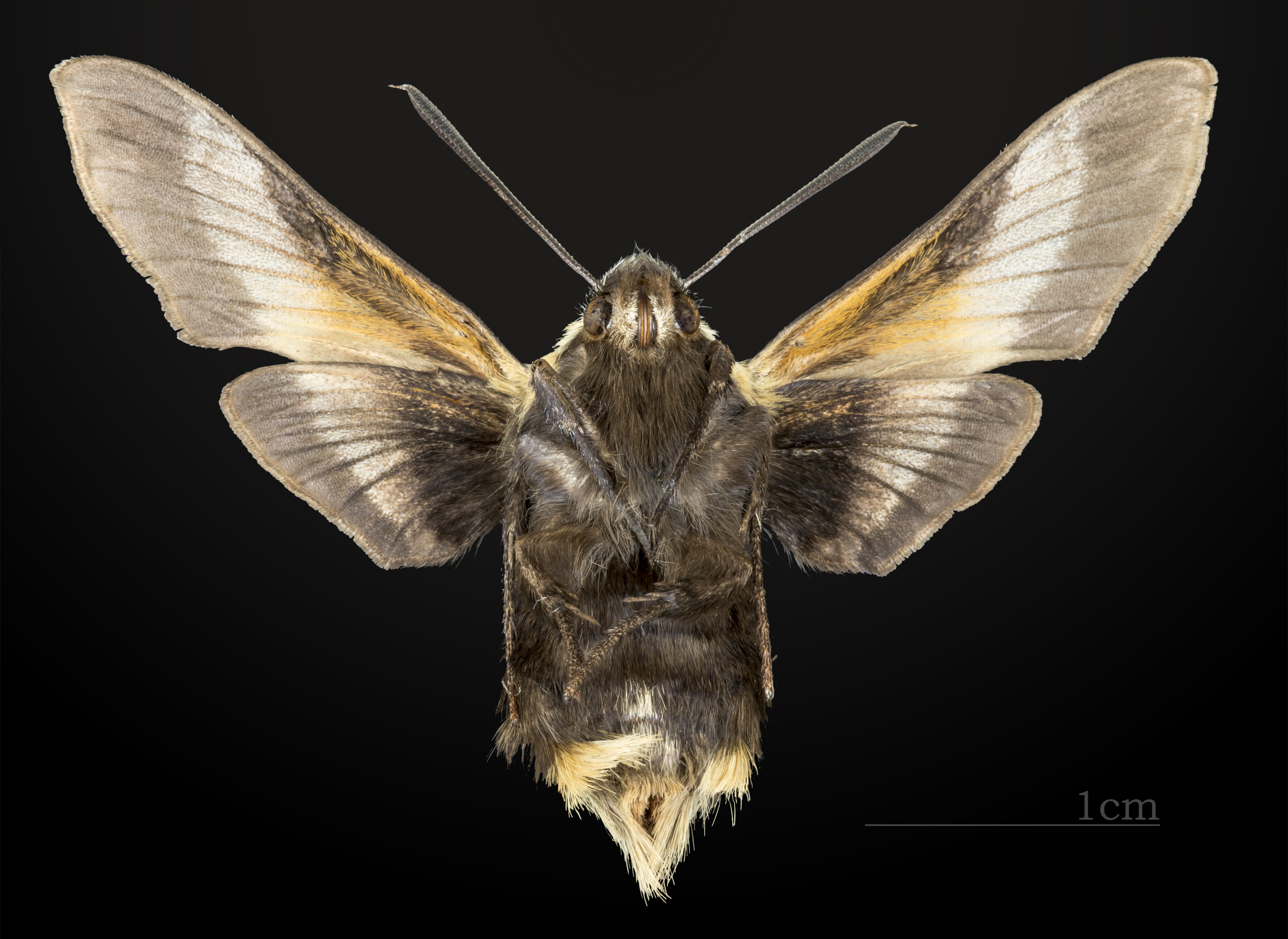
ventral

The larva feeds on various Epilobium and Rubus spp, such as Rubus parviflorus. The species overwinters as a pupa in the soil.
