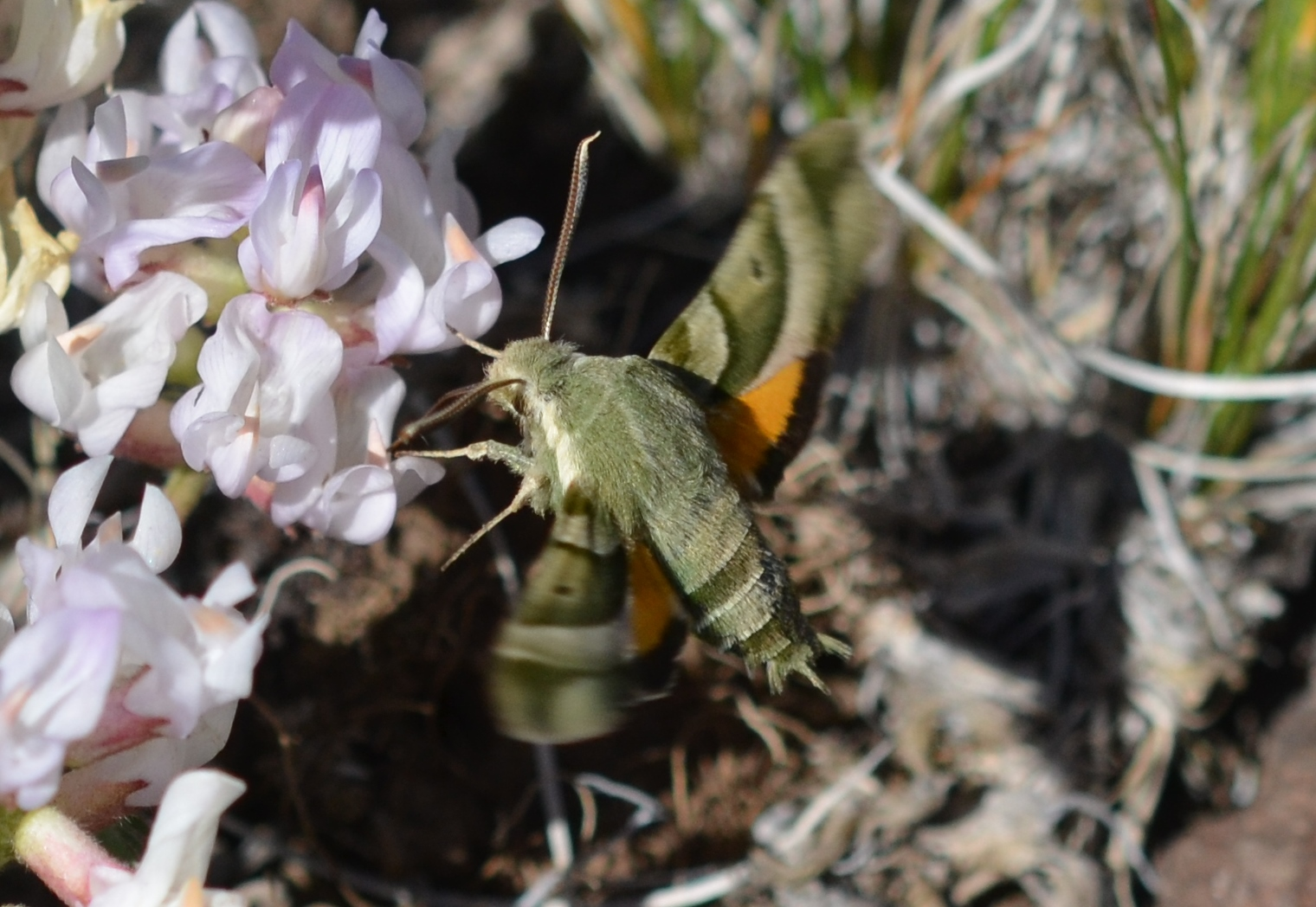

Scientific classification
- Kingdom: Animalia
- Phylum: Arthropoda
- Clade: Pancrustacea
- Class: Insecta
- Order: Lepidoptera
- Family: Sphingidae
- Genus: Proserpinus
- Species: P. clarkiae

Binomial name
- Proserpinus clarkiae (Boisduval, 1852)

Synonyms
- Pterogon clarkiae Boisduval, 1852; Lepisesia victoria Grote, 1874

= Proserpinus clarkiae =

Clark's sphinx

Species of moth

Proserpinus clarkiae, or Clark's sphinx, is a moth of the family Sphingidae. The species was first described by Jean Baptiste Boisduval in 1852. It is known from British Columbia and Washington south through California to Baja California, east to Idaho, Wyoming and Utah. The habitat consists of oak woodland and pine–oak woodland in foothills.

== Description ==
The wingspan is 30–38 mm. The forewing underside basal orange colour is vestigial or absent. The hindwing upperside is pale orange or yellowish and the marginal band of the hindwing is black.

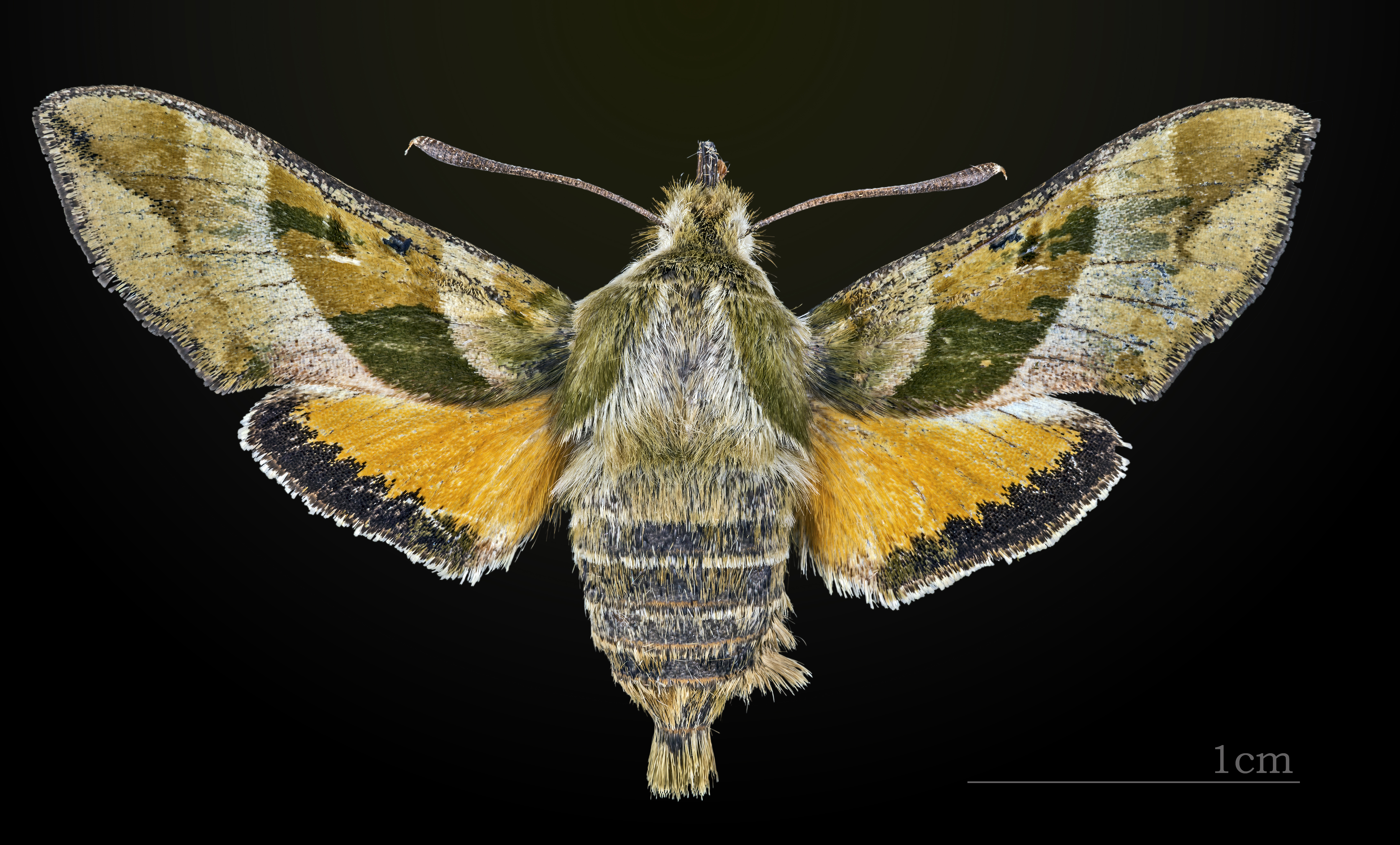
Female

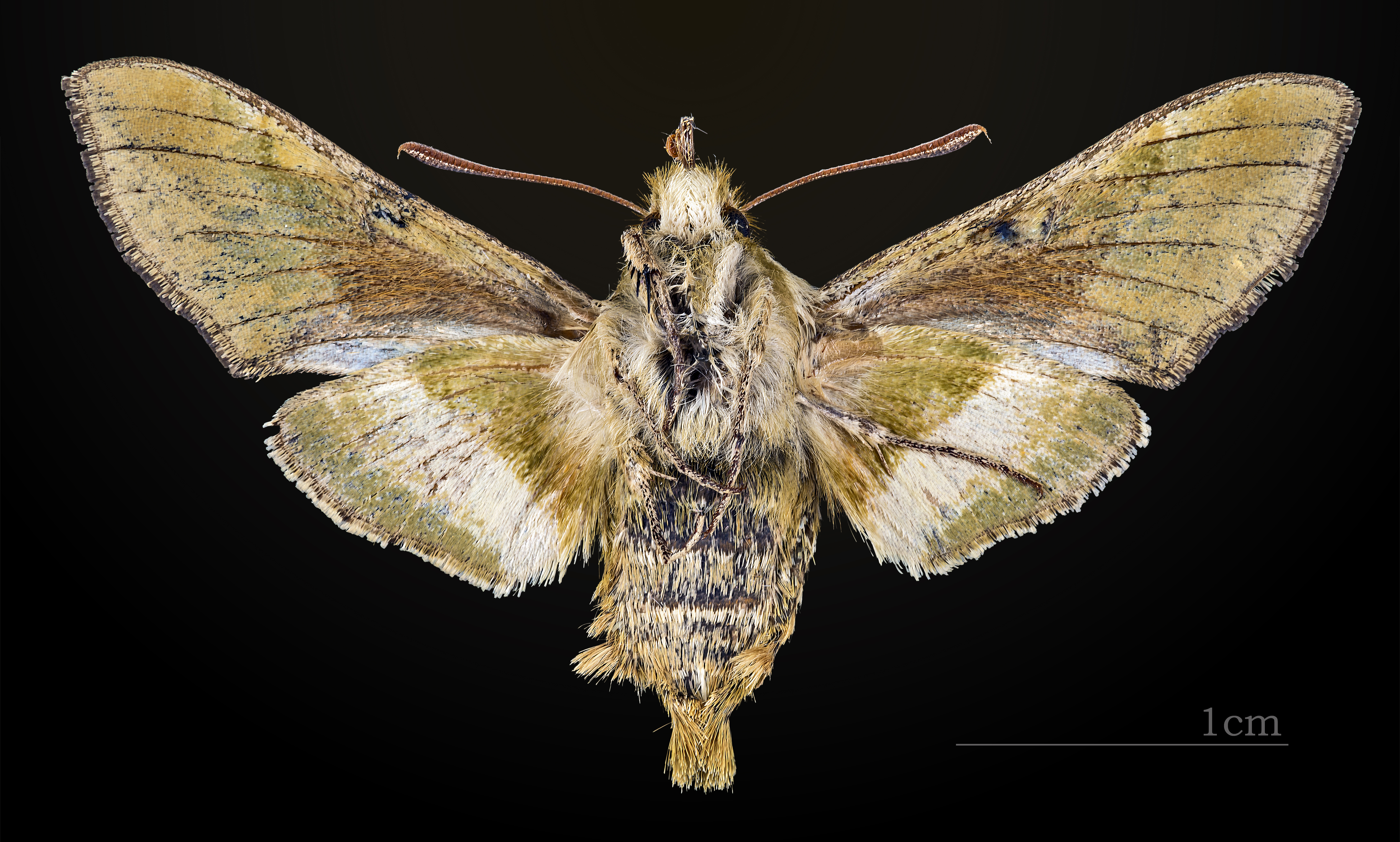
Female underside

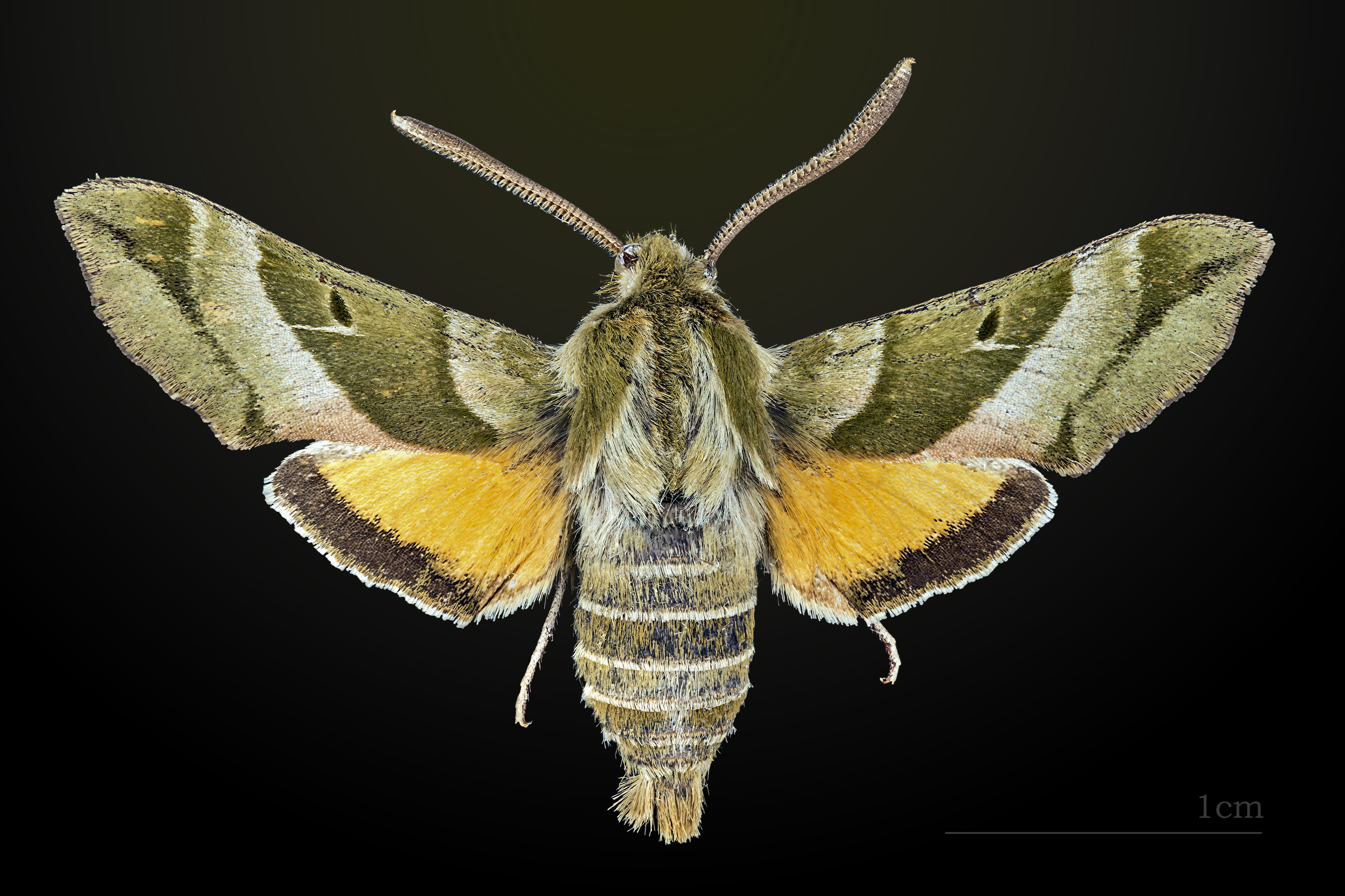
Male

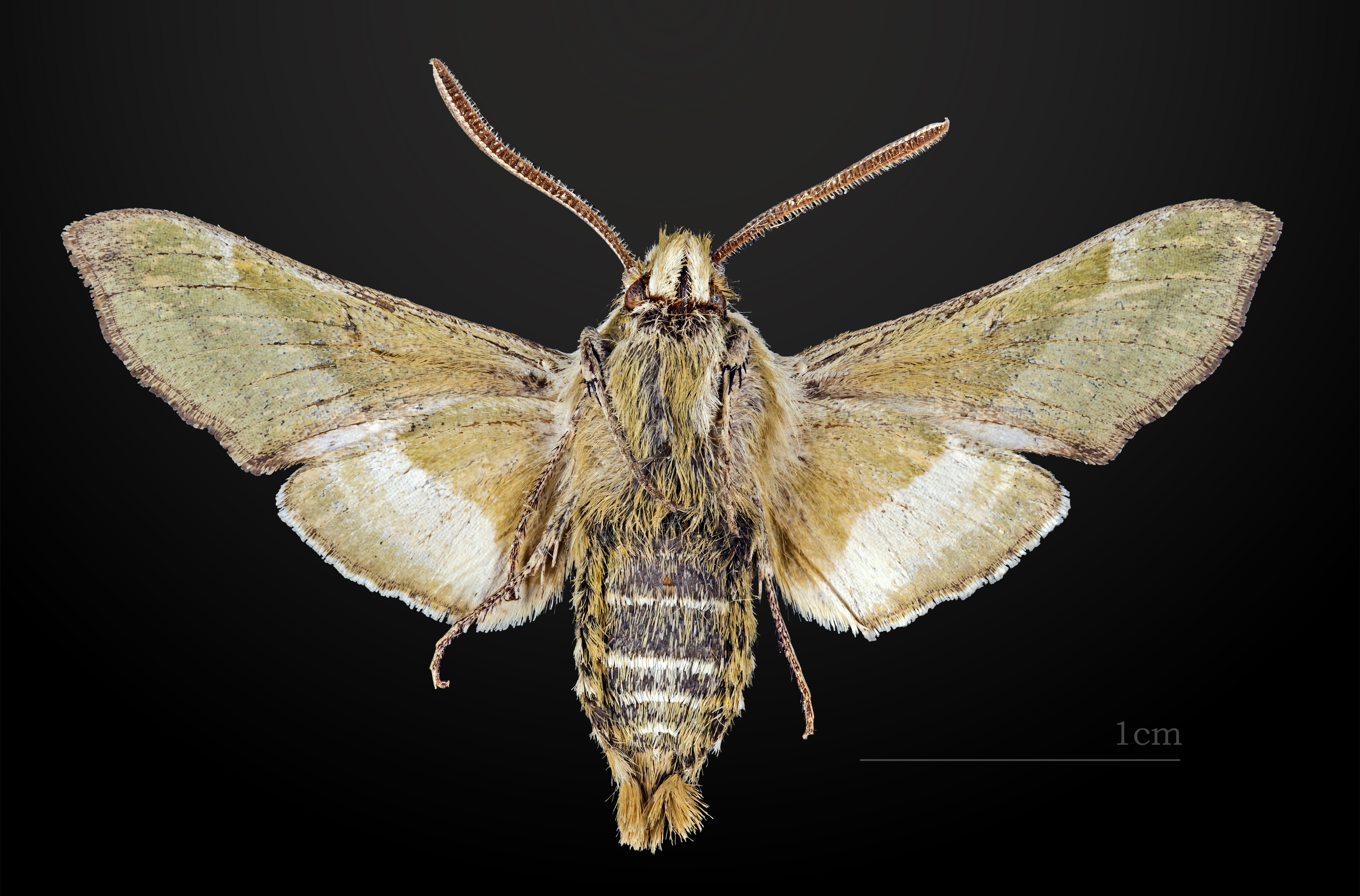
Male underside

== Biology ==
Adults are on wing from mid-March to June in one generation per year. The adults are diurnal, with activity occurring during daylight hours. They feed on the nectar of various flowers, including Salvia columbariae, Asclepias cordifolia, Ribes aureum, Dipterostemon capitatus, Clarkia, Vicia, Cirsium and Stachys species.

The larvae feed on Clarkia unguiculata.
