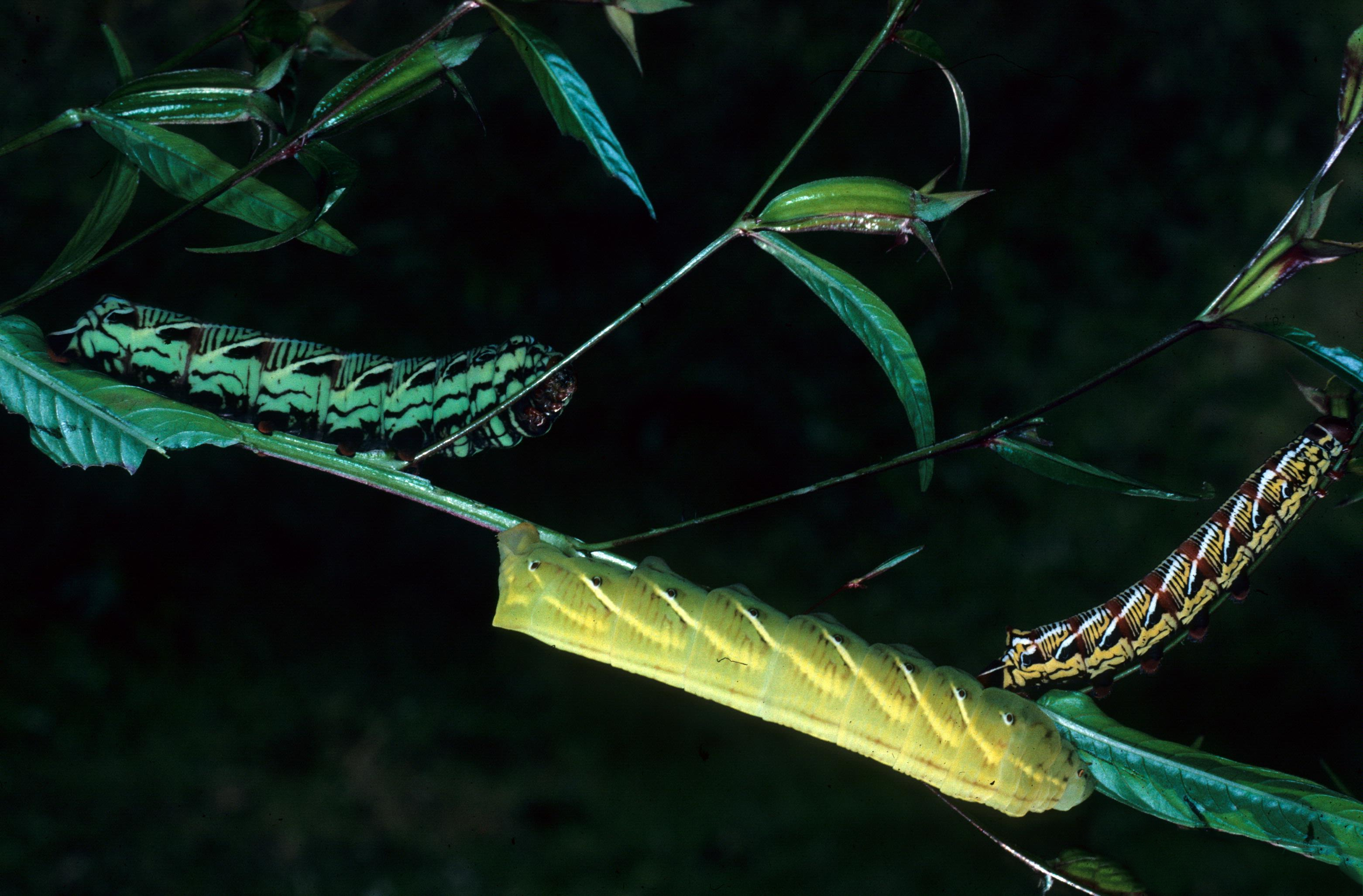

Scientific classification
- Kingdom: Animalia
- Phylum: Arthropoda
- Class: Insecta
- Order: Lepidoptera
- Family: Sphingidae
- Genus: Proserpinus
- Species: P. juanita

Binomial name
- Proserpinus juanita (Strecker, 1877)

Synonyms
- Pterogon juanita Strecker, 1876; Proserpinus juanita oslari Rothschild & Jordan, 1903

= Proserpinus juanita =

Juanita sphinx

Species of moth

Proserpinus juanita, the Juanita sphinx, is a moth of the family Sphingidae first described by Herman Strecker in 1877. It is found from the US states of Montana and North Dakota, south to Arizona, and east to Missouri and Texas.

== Description ==
The wingspan is 45–64 mm.

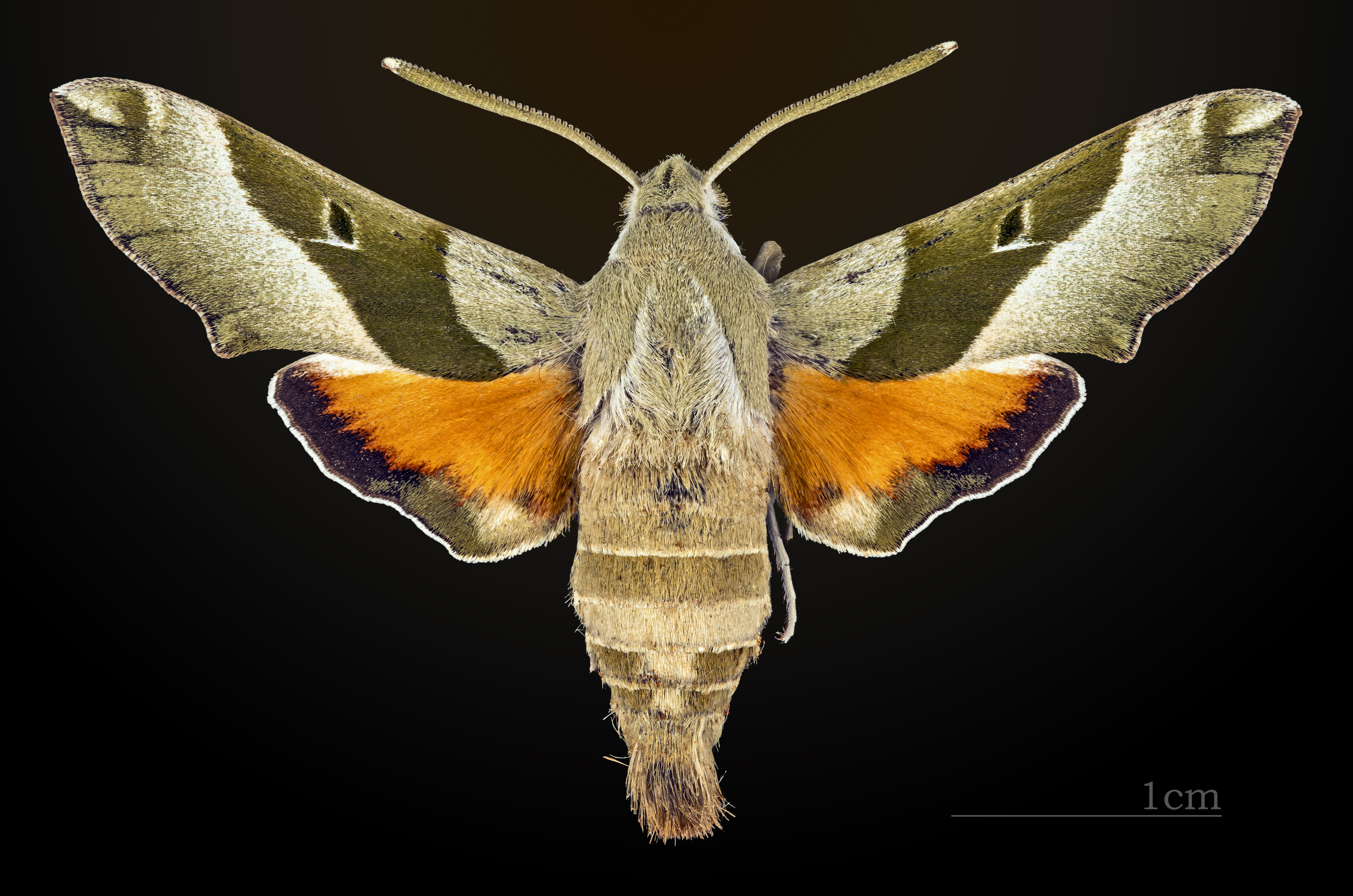
Dorsal view

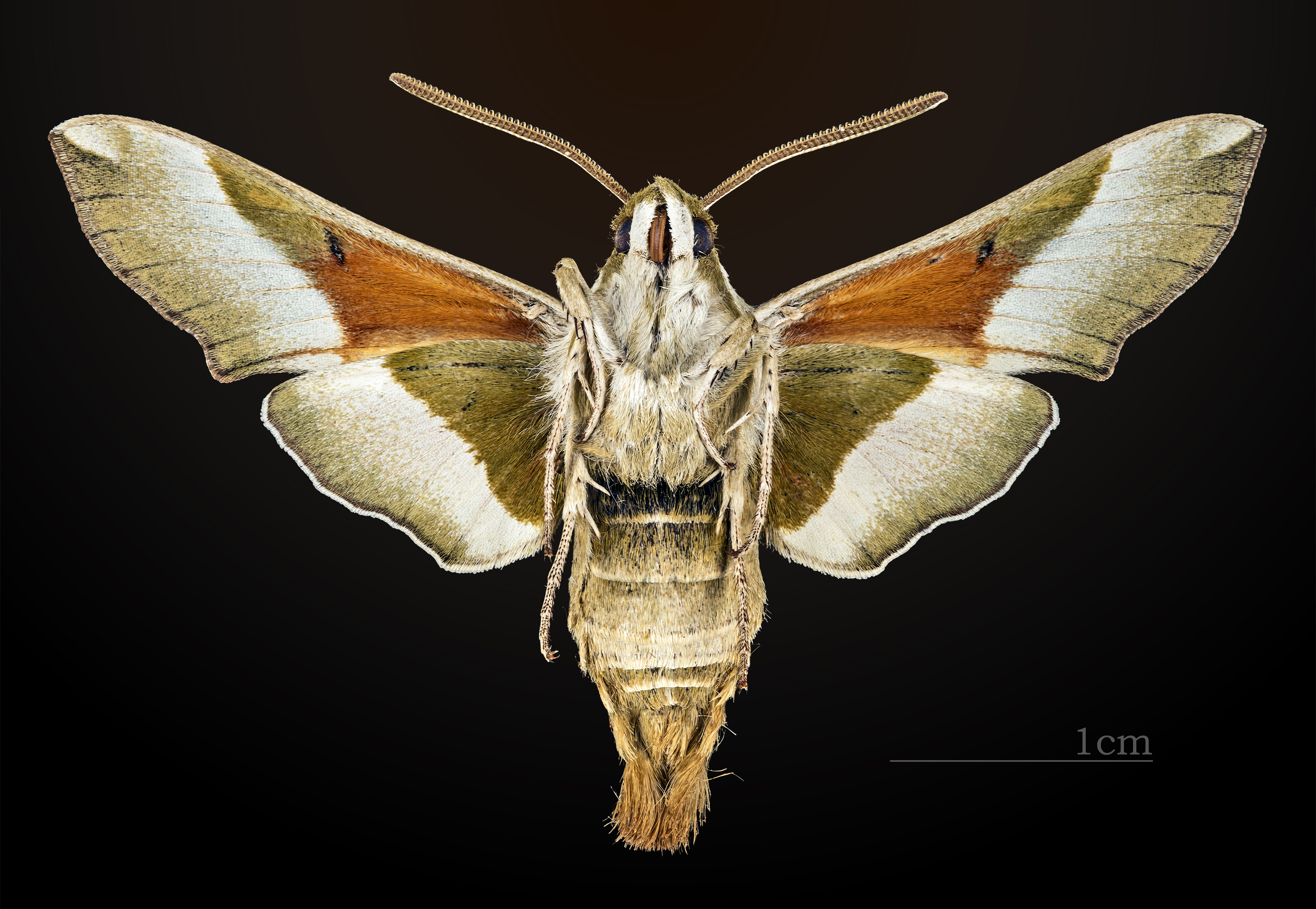
Ventral view

== Biology ==
The larvae feed on Onagraceae species, including Oenothera, Gaura and Epilobium species
