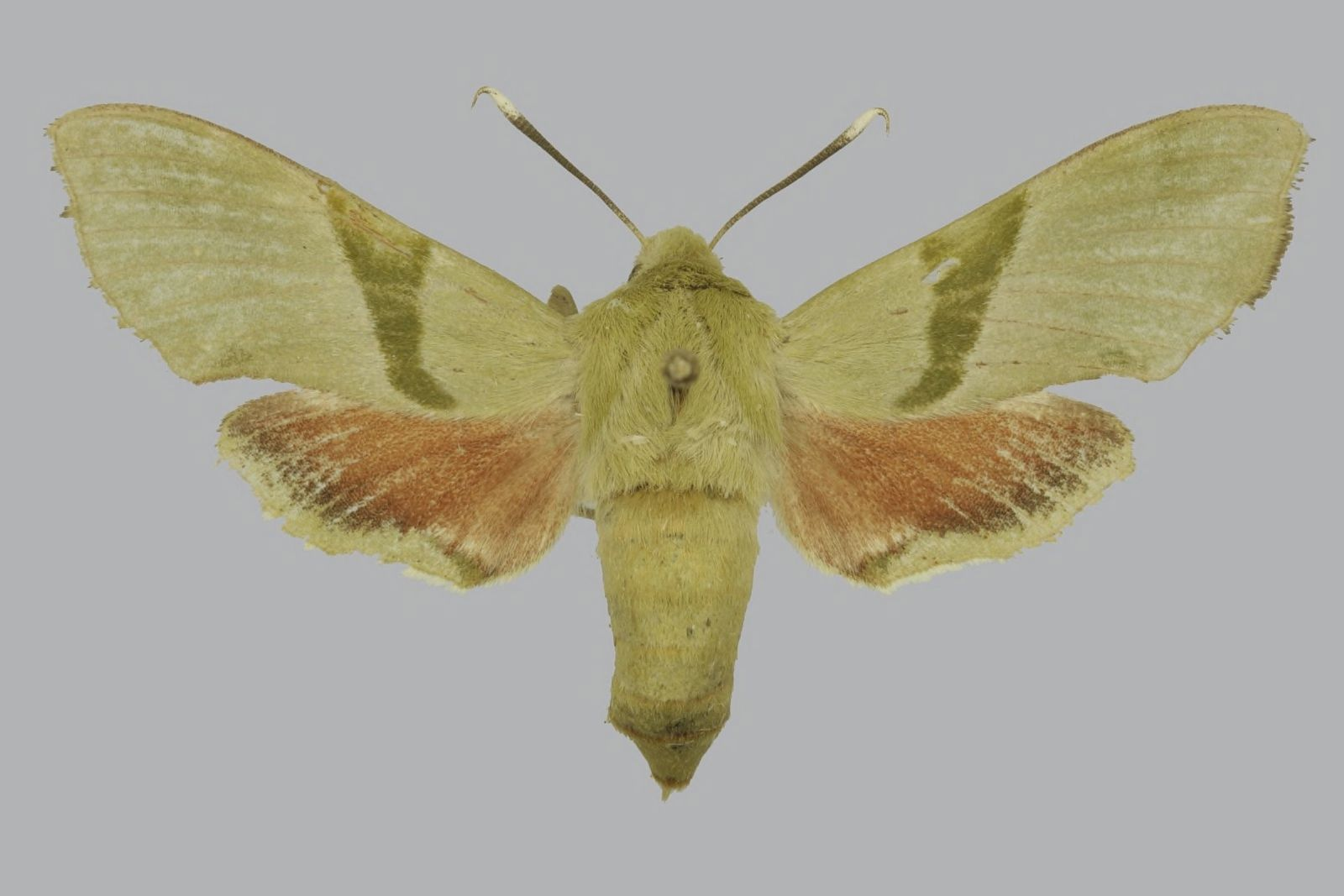

Scientific classification
- Domain: Eukaryota
- Kingdom: Animalia
- Phylum: Arthropoda
- Class: Insecta
- Order: Lepidoptera
- Family: Sphingidae
- Genus: Proserpinus
- Species: P. terlooi

Binomial name
- Proserpinus terlooi H. Edwards, 1875

Synonyms
- Arctonotus terlootii Barnes & Benjamin, 1927; Arctonotus terlooii mooseri Clark, 1937

= Proserpinus terlooi =

Terloo sphinx moth

Species of moth

Proserpinus terlooi, the Terloo sphinx moth, is a moth of the family Sphingidae first described by Henry Edwards in 1875. It is found from southern Arizona to Sonora in Mexico.

The wingspan is 42–48 mm.

There is one generation per year with adults on wing in July and August. Adults fly during the very late afternoon or evening, nectaring from flowers.

The larvae feed on Boerhavia species (including Boerhavia coccinea and Boerhavia coulteri).
