= List of Trichadenotecnum species =

This is a list of 217 species in Trichadenotecnum, a genus of common barklice in the family Psocidae.

== Trichadenotecnum species ==
- Trichadenotecnum aconcinnum Yoshizawa, Garcia Aldrete & Mockford, 2008^{c g}
- Trichadenotecnum acutolingum Yoshizawa, Garcia Aldrete & Mockford, 2008^{c g}
- Trichadenotecnum acutum Yoshizawa, Garcia Aldrete & Mockford, 2008^{c g}
- Trichadenotecnum adika Endang, Thornton & New, 2002^{c g}
- Trichadenotecnum aduncatum Li, Fasheng, 2002^{c g}
- Trichadenotecnum aggrogatum Li, Fasheng, 2001^{c g}
- Trichadenotecnum album Yoshizawa, 2001^{c g}
- Trichadenotecnum alexanderae Sommerman, 1948^{i c g b}
- Trichadenotecnum alinguum Endang, Thornton & New, 2002^{c g}
- Trichadenotecnum alobum Endang & New, 2005^{c g}
- Trichadenotecnum alternatum Li, Fasheng, 2002^{c g}
- Trichadenotecnum amamiense Yoshizawa, 2001^{c g}
- Trichadenotecnum ampullaceum Li, Fasheng, 2002^{c g}
- Trichadenotecnum angolense Badonnel, 1955^{c g}
- Trichadenotecnum anomalum Yoshizawa & Lienhard, 2014^{c g}
- Trichadenotecnum apertum Thornton, 1961^{c g}
- Trichadenotecnum arciforme Thornton, 1961^{c g}
- Trichadenotecnum auritum Yoshizawa & Lienhard, 2004^{c g}
- Trichadenotecnum baishanzuicum Li, Fasheng, 1995^{c g}
- Trichadenotecnum bannaense Li, Fasheng, 2002^{c g}
- Trichadenotecnum barrerai Yoshizawa, Garcia Aldrete & Mockford, 2008^{c g}
- Trichadenotecnum bicolor Li, Fasheng, 2001^{c g}
- Trichadenotecnum bidens Thornton, 1961^{c g}
- Trichadenotecnum bidentatum Thornton, 1984^{c g}
- Trichadenotecnum bigyrans Li, Fasheng, 2001^{c g}
- Trichadenotecnum bitenatum (Li, Fasheng, 1995)^{c}
- Trichadenotecnum bos Yoshizawa, Garcia Aldrete & Mockford, 2008^{c g}
- Trichadenotecnum brevicornum Yoshizawa, Garcia Aldrete & Mockford, 2008^{c g}
- Trichadenotecnum bromoense Endang, Thornton & New, 2002^{c g}
- Trichadenotecnum bucciniforme Li, Fasheng, 1993^{c g}
- Trichadenotecnum calycoideum Li, Fasheng, 2002^{c g}
- Trichadenotecnum carinatum Yoshizawa, Garcia Aldrete & Mockford, 2008^{c g}
- Trichadenotecnum castum Betz, 1983^{i c g b}
- Trichadenotecnum cerrosillae Yoshizawa, Garcia Aldrete & Mockford, 2008^{c g}
- Trichadenotecnum cheahae Endang, Thornton & New, 2002^{c g}
- Trichadenotecnum chiapense Yoshizawa, Garcia Aldrete & Mockford, 2008^{c g}
- Trichadenotecnum chinense Li, Fasheng, 1997^{c g}
- Trichadenotecnum cinnamonum Endang & New, 2005^{c g}
- Trichadenotecnum cintalapense Yoshizawa, Garcia Aldrete & Mockford, 2008^{c g}
- Trichadenotecnum circulare (Hagen, 1859)^{c g}
- Trichadenotecnum circularoides Badonnel, 1955^{i c g b}
- Trichadenotecnum colesae Turner, B. D. & Cheke, 1983^{c g}
- Trichadenotecnum concinnum Yoshizawa, Garcia Aldrete & Mockford, 2008^{c g}
- Trichadenotecnum corniculum Yoshizawa, 2003^{c g}
- Trichadenotecnum cornutum Endang & New, 2005^{c g}
- Trichadenotecnum corollatum (Li, Fasheng, 2002)^{c g}
- Trichadenotecnum cynostigmus (Li, Fasheng, 2002)^{c g}
- Trichadenotecnum dactylinum Li, Fasheng, 2002^{c g}
- Trichadenotecnum danieli Yoshizawa & Lienhard, 2007^{c g}
- Trichadenotecnum decui Badonnel, 1987^{c g}
- Trichadenotecnum denticulatum Yoshizawa, Garcia Aldrete & Mockford, 2008^{c g}
- Trichadenotecnum depitarense Yoshizawa & Lienhard, 2007^{c g}
- Trichadenotecnum desolatum (Chapman, 1930)^{i c g}
- Trichadenotecnum digitatum Li, Fasheng, 2002^{c g}
- Trichadenotecnum diplodurum Li, Fasheng, 2002^{c g}
- Trichadenotecnum distinctum Datta, 1969^{c g}
- Trichadenotecnum dobhanense New, 1973^{c g}
- Trichadenotecnum dolabratum Li, Fasheng & Chikun Yang, 1987^{c g}
- Trichadenotecnum emeishanense Li, Fasheng, 2002^{c g}
- Trichadenotecnum endangae Yoshizawa & Lienhard, 2014^{c g}
- Trichadenotecnum enneagonum (Li, Fasheng, 2002)^{c g}
- Trichadenotecnum ericium Yoshizawa, Garcia Aldrete & Mockford, 2008^{c g}
- Trichadenotecnum erwini Yoshizawa, Garcia Aldrete & Mockford, 2008^{c g}
- Trichadenotecnum falx Yoshizawa, 2001^{c g}
- Trichadenotecnum felix Thornton, 1961^{c g}
- Trichadenotecnum furcalingum Yoshizawa, 2001^{c g}
- Trichadenotecnum fuscipenne Yoshizawa, 2001^{c g}
- Trichadenotecnum galihi Endang, Thornton & New, 2002^{c g}
- Trichadenotecnum gallicum Lienhard, 1986^{c g}
- Trichadenotecnum germanicum Roesler, 1939^{c g}
- Trichadenotecnum germinatum Yoshizawa, 2003^{c g}
- Trichadenotecnum godavarense New, 1971^{c g}
- Trichadenotecnum gombakense New & S. S. Lee, 1992^{c g}
- Trichadenotecnum gonzalezi (Williner, 1945)^{c g}
- Trichadenotecnum guandongicum Li, Fasheng, 1993^{c g}
- Trichadenotecnum guangxiicum (Li, Fasheng, 2002)^{c g}
- Trichadenotecnum gutianum Li, Fasheng, 1995^{c g}
- Trichadenotecnum guttatum Yoshizawa, Garcia Aldrete & Mockford, 2008^{c g}
- Trichadenotecnum hammani Endang, Thornton & New, 2002^{c g}
- Trichadenotecnum hengshanicum (Li, Fasheng, 2002)^{c g}
- Trichadenotecnum himalayense Li, Fasheng & Chikun Yang, 1987^{c g}
- Trichadenotecnum iani Yoshizawa & Lienhard, 2004^{c g}
- Trichadenotecnum ianobidens Yoshizawa & Lienhard, 2004^{c g}
- Trichadenotecnum imperatorium Li, Fasheng, 1989^{c g}
- Trichadenotecnum imrum New & Thornton, 1976^{c g}
- Trichadenotecnum incognitum Roesler, 1939^{c g}
- Trichadenotecnum innuptum Betz, 1983^{i c g}
- Trichadenotecnum isocaulum Li, Fasheng, 2002^{c g}
- Trichadenotecnum isseii Yoshizawa & Lienhard, 2007^{c g}
- Trichadenotecnum jaculatorum Li, Fasheng, 2002^{c g}
- Trichadenotecnum jambiense Endang & New, 2005^{c g}
- Trichadenotecnum jinxiuense Li, Fasheng, 2002^{c g}
- Trichadenotecnum kalibiruense Endang & New, 2005^{c g}
- Trichadenotecnum kerinciense Endang & New, 2005^{c g}
- Trichadenotecnum kojimai Yoshizawa & Lienhard, 2014^{c g}
- Trichadenotecnum krucilense Endang, Thornton & New, 2002^{c g}
- Trichadenotecnum kumejimense Yoshizawa, 2001^{c g}
- Trichadenotecnum kunmingicum Li, Fasheng, 2002^{c g}
- Trichadenotecnum latebrachium Yoshizawa, 2001^{c g}
- Trichadenotecnum laticornutum Endang, Thornton & New, 2002^{c g}
- Trichadenotecnum latipenne Yoshizawa, Garcia Aldrete & Mockford, 2008^{c g}
- Trichadenotecnum longilingum Yoshizawa, Garcia Aldrete & Mockford, 2008^{c g}
- Trichadenotecnum longimucronatum (Li, Fasheng, 1997)^{c g}
- Trichadenotecnum longivalvum Li, Fasheng, 2005^{c g}
- Trichadenotecnum maculatum Yoshizawa, Garcia Aldrete & Mockford, 2008^{c g}
- Trichadenotecnum magnolingum Yoshizawa, Garcia Aldrete & Mockford, 2008^{c g}
- Trichadenotecnum magnomixtum Yoshizawa, 2001^{c g}
- Trichadenotecnum majus (Kolbe, 1880)^{i c g b}
- Trichadenotecnum malayense New, 1975^{c g}
- Trichadenotecnum malickyi Yoshizawa & Lienhard, 2007^{c g}
- Trichadenotecnum mamillatum Li, Fasheng, 2002^{c g}
- Trichadenotecnum marginatum New & Thornton, 1976^{c g}
- Trichadenotecnum maroccanum Baz, 1989^{c g}
- Trichadenotecnum masoni New, 1971^{c g}
- Trichadenotecnum mclachlani New, 1973^{c g}
- Trichadenotecnum medium Thornton, 1961^{c g}
- Trichadenotecnum merum Betz, 1983^{i c g b}
- Trichadenotecnum miffy Yoshizawa, Garcia Aldrete & Mockford, 2008^{c g}
- Trichadenotecnum minisexmaculatum Li, Fasheng & Chikun Yang, 1987^{c g}
- Trichadenotecnum minutum Enderlein, 1926^{c g}
- Trichadenotecnum mixtum Yoshizawa, 2001^{c g}
- Trichadenotecnum monodactylinum Li, Fasheng, 2001^{c g}
- Trichadenotecnum muaraense Endang & New, 2005^{c g}
- Trichadenotecnum multangulare (Li, Fasheng, 2002)^{c g}
- Trichadenotecnum multicuspidatum Li, Fasheng, 2002^{c g}
- Trichadenotecnum nebulosum Vaughan, Thornton & New, 1991^{c g}
- Trichadenotecnum neoleonense Yoshizawa, Garcia Aldrete & Mockford, 2008^{c g}
- Trichadenotecnum nepalense Yoshizawa & Lienhard, 2007^{c g}
- Trichadenotecnum nicaraguense Yoshizawa, Garcia Aldrete & Mockford, 2008^{c g}
- Trichadenotecnum nothoapertum Yoshizawa, 2001^{c g}
- Trichadenotecnum oaxacense Yoshizawa, Garcia Aldrete & Mockford, 2008^{c g}
- Trichadenotecnum obliquidens Li, Fasheng, 2001^{c g}
- Trichadenotecnum obrienorum Yoshizawa, Garcia Aldrete & Mockford, 2008^{c g}
- Trichadenotecnum obsitum (Enderlein, 1908)^{c g}
- Trichadenotecnum obsubulatum Li, Fasheng, 2002^{c g}
- Trichadenotecnum octogonum (Li, Fasheng, 2002)^{c g}
- Trichadenotecnum okinawense Yoshizawa, 2001^{c g}
- Trichadenotecnum opiparipardale (Li, Fasheng, 1995)^{c g}
- Trichadenotecnum paradika Endang & New, 2005^{c g}
- Trichadenotecnum pardidum Thornton, 1961^{c g}
- Trichadenotecnum pardoides Badonnel, 1955^{c g}
- Trichadenotecnum pardus Badonnel, 1955^{i c g}
- Trichadenotecnum paululum Li, Fasheng, 2002^{c g}
- Trichadenotecnum perbellum (Li, Fasheng, 2002)^{c g}
- Trichadenotecnum percussum Li, Fasheng, 2002^{c g}
- Trichadenotecnum pergracilum Li, Fasheng, 2002^{c g}
- Trichadenotecnum periphericum Li, Fasheng, 2001^{c g}
- Trichadenotecnum peruense Yoshizawa, Garcia Aldrete & Mockford, 2008^{c g}
- Trichadenotecnum pichincha New & Thornton, 1975^{c g}
- Trichadenotecnum pictipenne Badonnel, 1973^{c g}
- Trichadenotecnum pokhariense New, 1983^{c g}
- Trichadenotecnum proctum Endang & New, 2005^{c g}
- Trichadenotecnum pseudomedium Yoshizawa, 2001^{c g}
- Trichadenotecnum punctipenne New, 1972^{c g}
- Trichadenotecnum pycnacanthum Li, Fasheng, 2002^{c g}
- Trichadenotecnum qingshuicum Li, Fasheng, 2002^{c g}
- Trichadenotecnum quadrispinosum Endang, Thornton & New, 2002^{c g}
- Trichadenotecnum quadruplex Li, Fasheng, 2002^{c g}
- Trichadenotecnum quaesitellum Yoshizawa, Garcia Aldrete & Mockford, 2008^{c g}
- Trichadenotecnum quaesitum (Chapman, 1930)^{i c g b}
- Trichadenotecnum quinarium (Li, Fasheng, 2002)^{c g}
- Trichadenotecnum rachimi Endang & Thornton, 1992^{c g}
- Trichadenotecnum rectangulum Li, Fasheng, 1992^{c g}
- Trichadenotecnum resupinum (Li, Fasheng, 1997)^{c}
- Trichadenotecnum rhomboides Li, Fasheng, 2002^{c g}
- Trichadenotecnum roesleri New, 1972^{c g}
- Trichadenotecnum sabahense Yoshizawa & Lienhard, 2015^{c g}
- Trichadenotecnum santosai Endang & Thornton, 1992^{c g}
- Trichadenotecnum sclerotum New, 1978^{c g}
- Trichadenotecnum scoparium (Li, Fasheng, 1995)^{c}
- Trichadenotecnum scrobiculare Li, Fasheng, 1992^{c g}
- Trichadenotecnum sexpunctatum (Linnaeus, 1758)^{c g}
- Trichadenotecnum sexpunctellum (Enderlein, 1907)^{c g}
- Trichadenotecnum sharkeyi Yoshizawa & Lienhard, 2015^{c g}
- Trichadenotecnum shawi Yoshizawa & Garcia Aldrete, 2010^{c g}
- Trichadenotecnum shilinicum (Li, Fasheng, 2002)^{c g}
- Trichadenotecnum sibolangitense Endang & New, 2005^{c g}
- Trichadenotecnum simile Mockford, 1996^{c g}
- Trichadenotecnum sinuatum New, 1972^{c g}
- Trichadenotecnum slossonae (Banks, 1903)^{i c g b}
- Trichadenotecnum soekarmanni Endang, Thornton & New, 2002^{c g}
- Trichadenotecnum soenarti Endang, Thornton & New, 2002^{c g}
- Trichadenotecnum sparsum Yoshizawa, Garcia Aldrete & Mockford, 2008^{c g}
- Trichadenotecnum spiniserrulum Datta, 1969^{c g}
- Trichadenotecnum spuristipiatum Li, Fasheng, 1997^{c g}
- Trichadenotecnum stipiatum Li, Fasheng, 1992^{c g}
- Trichadenotecnum stipulatum Li, Fasheng, 2002^{c g}
- Trichadenotecnum subrotundum Li, Fasheng, 2001^{c g}
- Trichadenotecnum subscalare Li, Fasheng, 2002^{c g}
- Trichadenotecnum sufflatum Li, Fasheng, 1993^{c g}
- Trichadenotecnum sumatrense Endang & New, 2005^{c g}
- Trichadenotecnum suwai Yoshizawa & Lienhard, 2007^{c g}
- Trichadenotecnum sylvaticum Turner, B. D., 1975^{c g}
- Trichadenotecnum takahashii Yoshizawa, 2001^{c g}
- Trichadenotecnum tambopatense Yoshizawa, Garcia Aldrete & Mockford, 2008^{c g}
- Trichadenotecnum tenuispinum Li, Fasheng, 1995^{c g}
- Trichadenotecnum thallodialum Li, Fasheng, 2002^{c g}
- Trichadenotecnum thorntoni New, 1975^{c g}
- Trichadenotecnum tigrinum Yoshizawa & Lienhard, 2015^{c g}
- Trichadenotecnum trichotomum Li, Fasheng, 2002^{c g}
- Trichadenotecnum trigonophyllum Li, Fasheng, 1993^{c g}
- Trichadenotecnum trigonosceneum (Enderlein, 1911)^{c g}
- Trichadenotecnum tuitense Yoshizawa, Garcia Aldrete & Mockford, 2008^{c g}
- Trichadenotecnum turriforme (Li, Fasheng, 1995)^{c g}
- Trichadenotecnum unciforme (Li, Fasheng, 2002)^{c g}
- Trichadenotecnum uncorne (Li, Fasheng, 1995)^{c g}
- Trichadenotecnum uniforme Li, Fasheng, 2002^{c g}
- Trichadenotecnum univittatum Li, Fasheng, 2002^{c g}
- Trichadenotecnum vaughani Endang, Thornton & New, 2002^{c g}
- Trichadenotecnum waykambasense Endang & New, 2005^{c g}
- Trichadenotecnum waykananense Endang & New, 2005^{c g}
- Trichadenotecnum wuxiacum Li, Fasheng, 1997^{c g}
- Trichadenotecnum xizangicum Li, Fasheng, 2002^{c g}
- Trichadenotecnum yaeyamense Yoshizawa, 2001^{c g}
- Trichadenotecnum yamatomajus Yoshizawa, 2001^{c g}
- Trichadenotecnum yatai Yoshizawa & Lienhard, 2014^{c g}
- Trichadenotecnum yonaguniense Yoshizawa, 2001^{c g}

Data sources: i = ITIS, c = Catalogue of Life, g = GBIF, b = Bugguide.net
