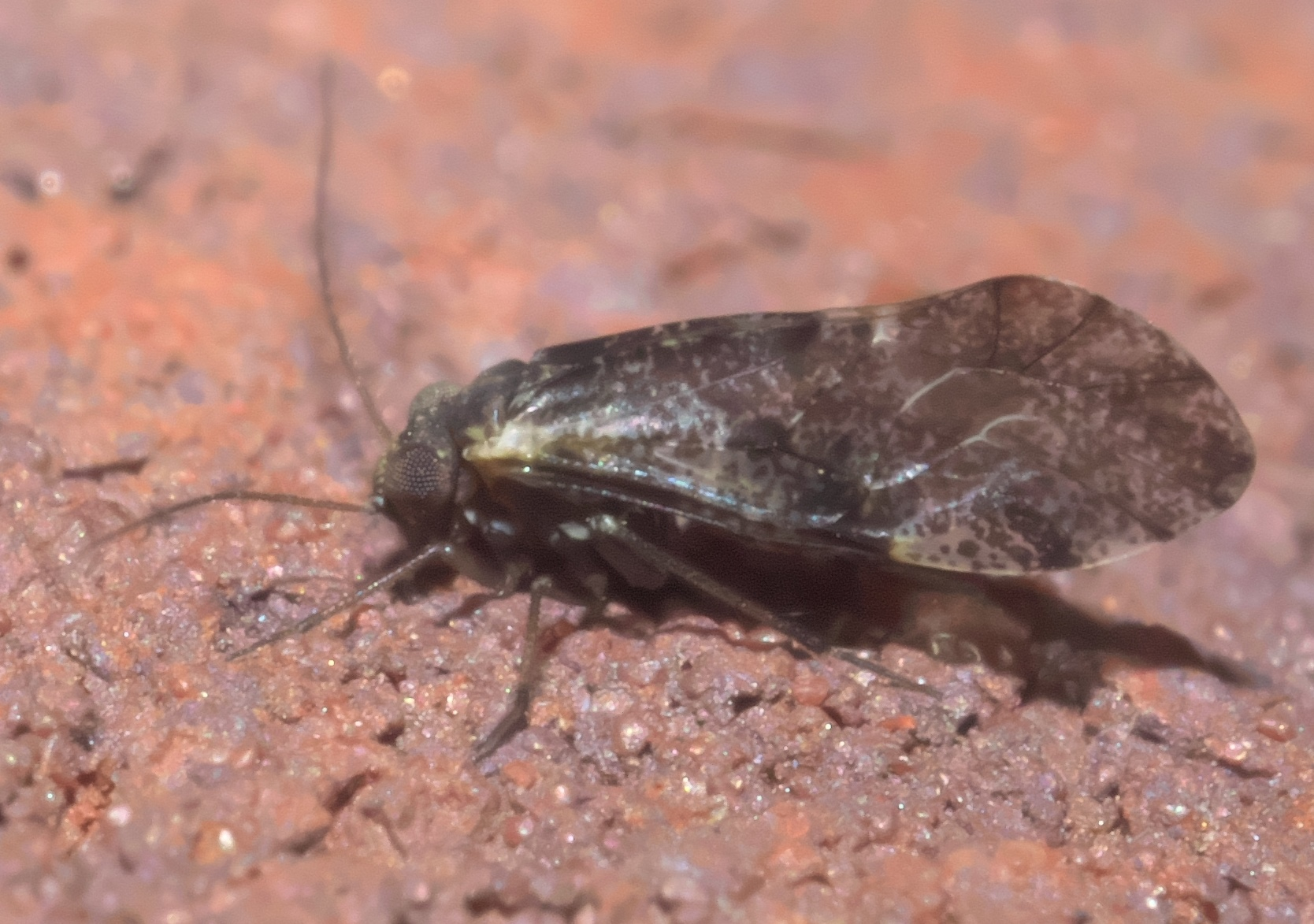

Scientific classification
- Domain: Eukaryota
- Kingdom: Animalia
- Phylum: Arthropoda
- Class: Insecta
- Order: Psocodea
- Family: Psocidae
- Tribe: Ptyctini
- Genus: Loensia
- Species: L. moesta

Binomial name
- Loensia moesta (Hagen, 1861)

= Loensia moesta =

Species of booklouse

Loensia moesta is a species of common barklouse in the family Psocidae. It is found in North America.

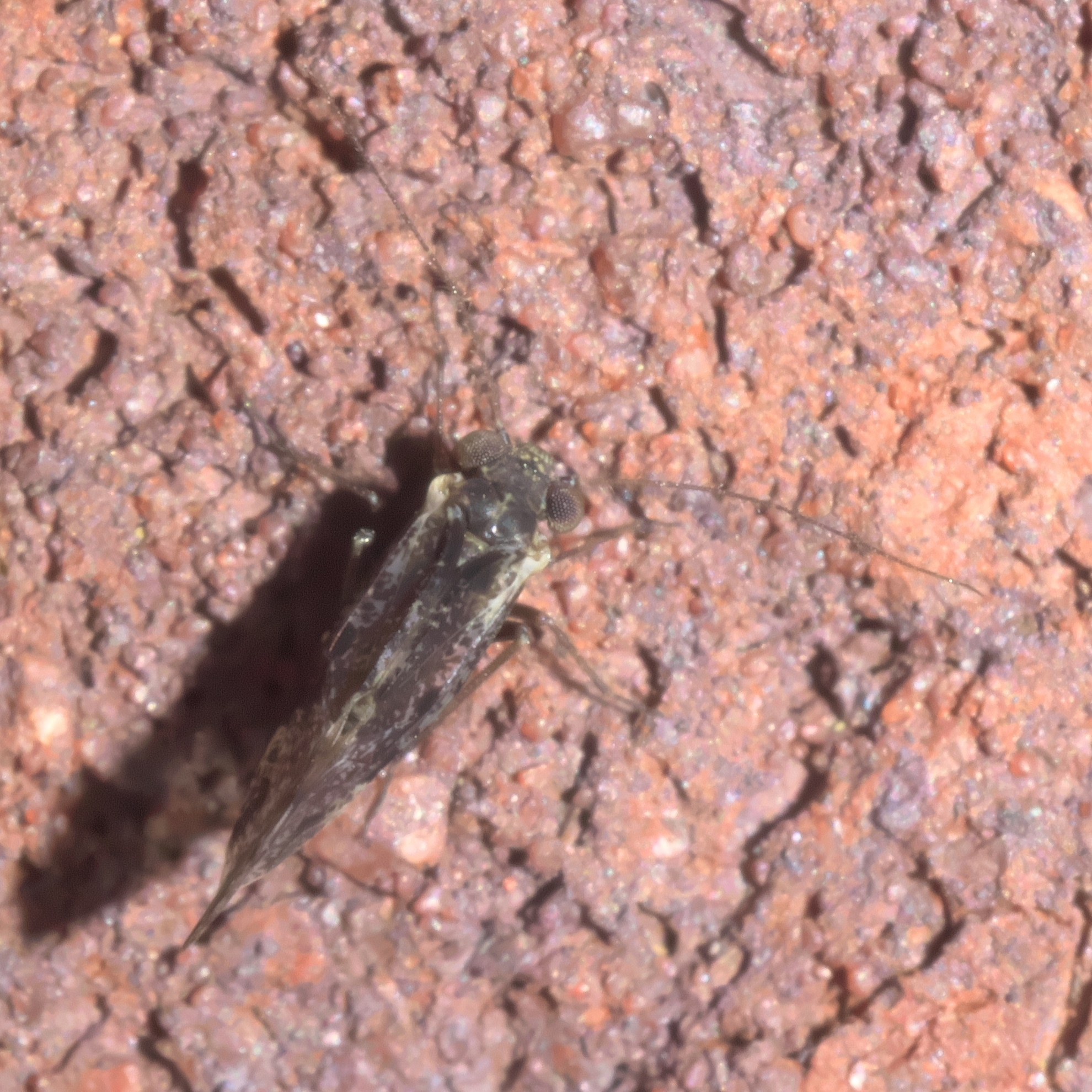

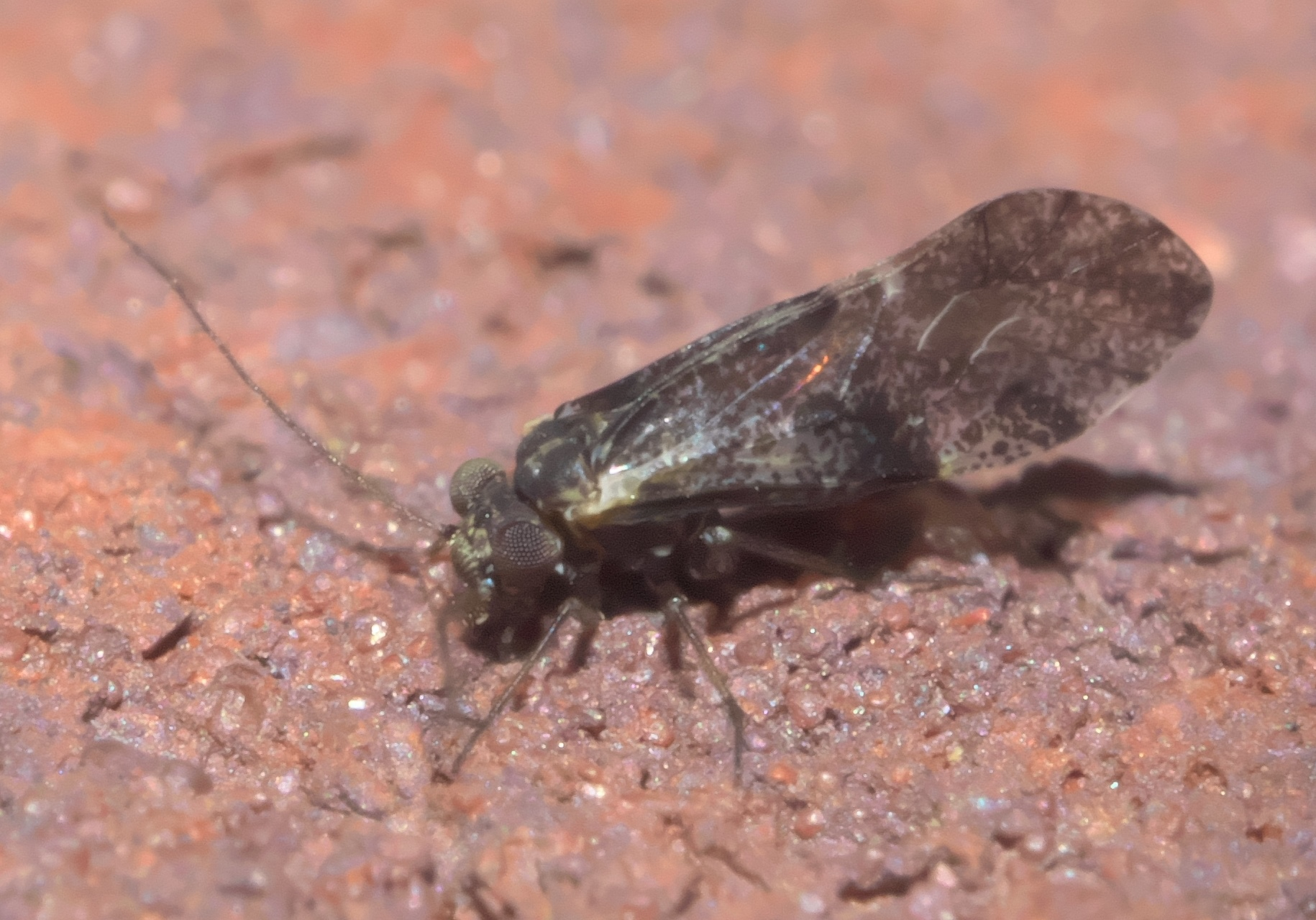
