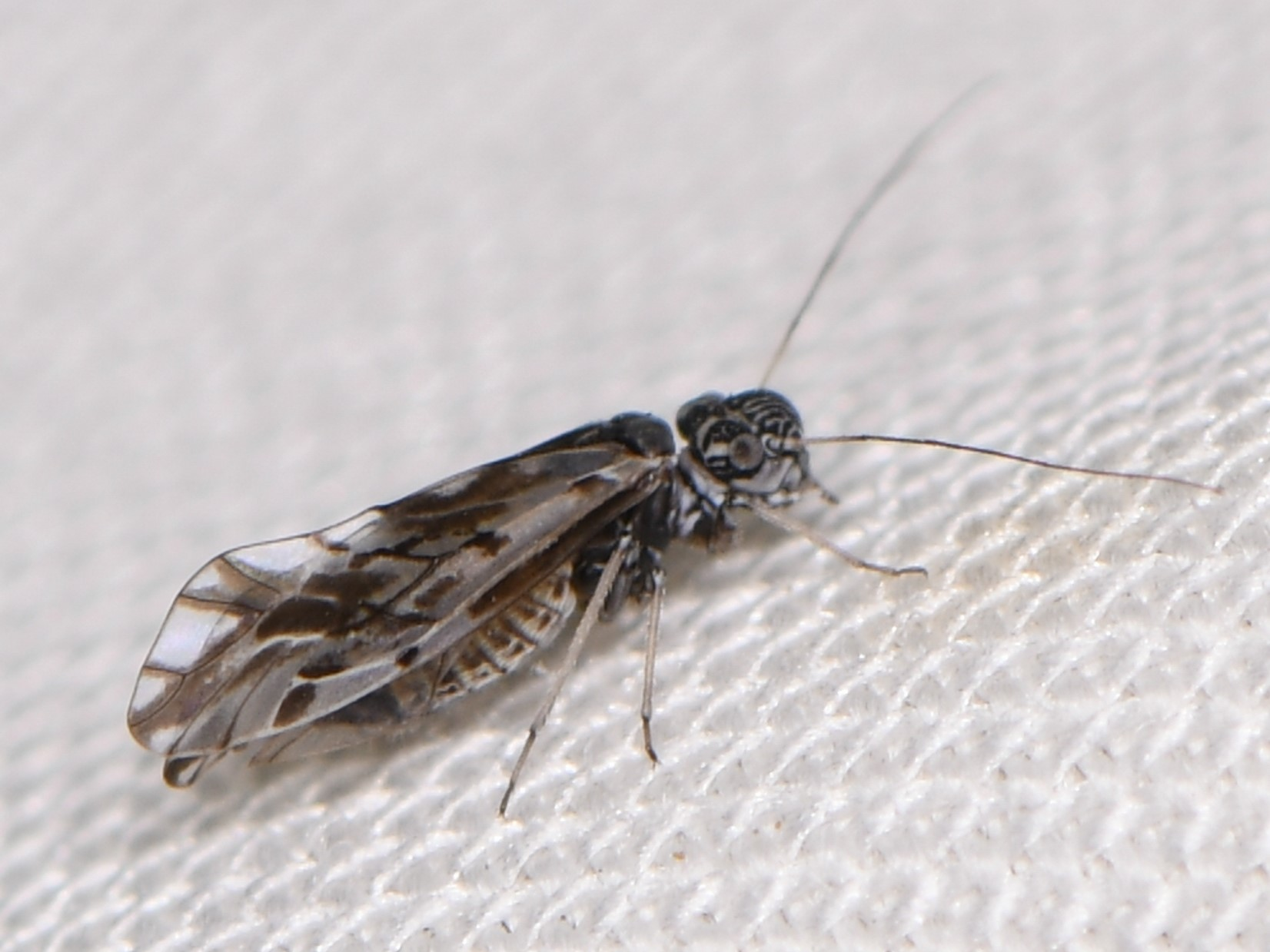

Scientific classification
- Kingdom: Animalia
- Phylum: Arthropoda
- Clade: Pancrustacea
- Class: Insecta
- Order: Psocodea
- Family: Psocidae
- Tribe: Ptyctini
- Genus: Indiopsocus
- Species: I. coquilletti

Binomial name
- Indiopsocus coquilletti (Banks, 1920)

= Indiopsocus coquilletti =

Species of booklouse

Indiopsocus coquilletti is a species of common barklouse in the family Psocidae. It is found in Central America and North America.
