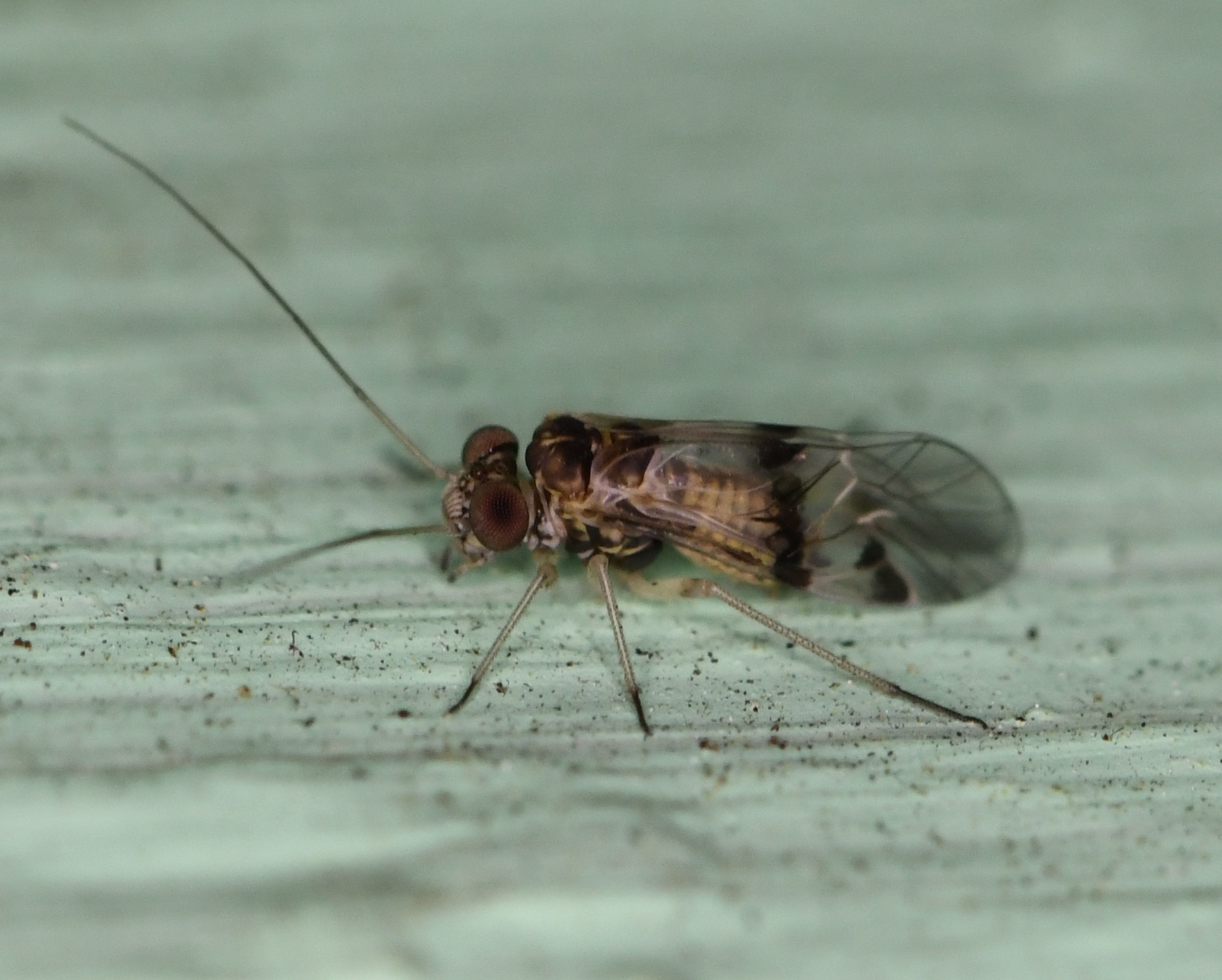

Scientific classification
- Kingdom: Animalia
- Phylum: Arthropoda
- Clade: Pancrustacea
- Class: Insecta
- Order: Psocodea
- Family: Psocidae
- Tribe: Ptyctini
- Genus: Indiopsocus
- Species: I. texanus

Binomial name
- Indiopsocus texanus (Aaron, 1886)

= Indiopsocus texanus =

Species of booklouse

Indiopsocus texanus is a species of common barklouse in the family Psocidae. It is found in North America and the Caribbean.
