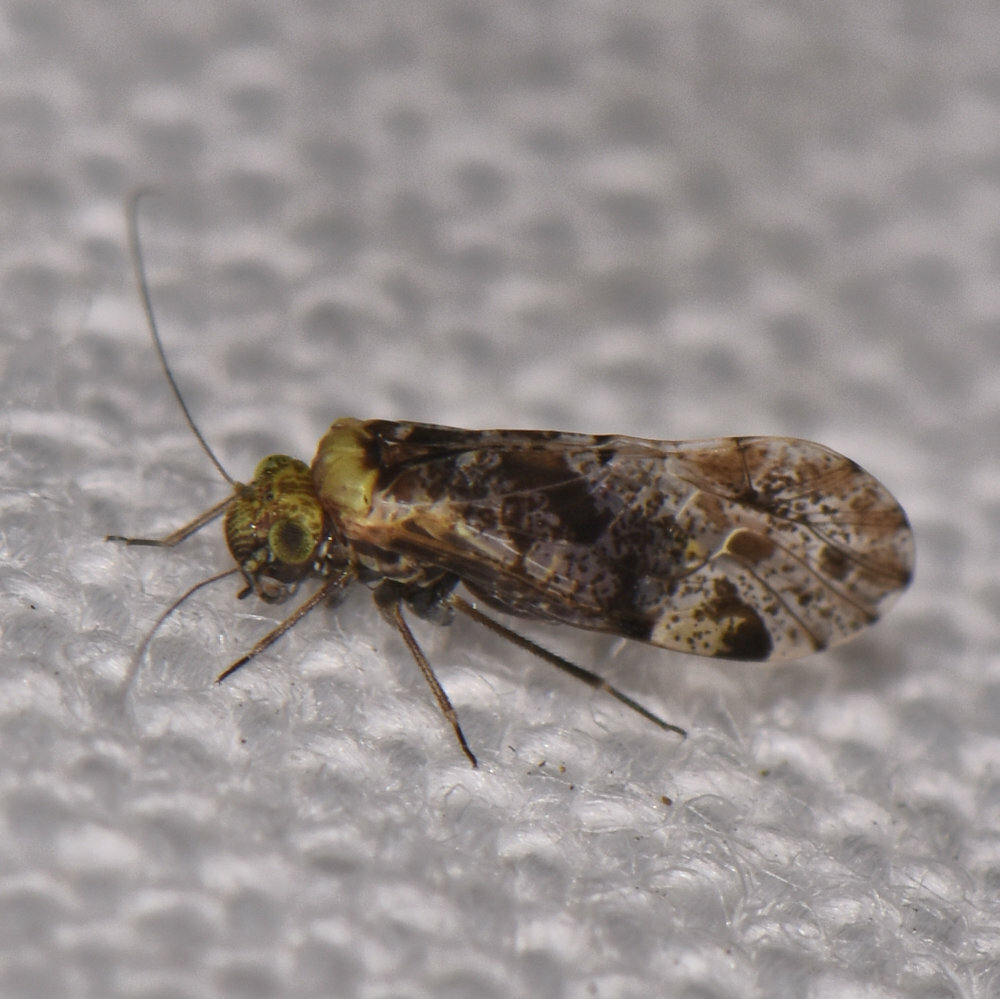
- Trichadenotecnum alexanderae, Canada

Scientific classification
- Domain: Eukaryota
- Kingdom: Animalia
- Phylum: Arthropoda
- Class: Insecta
- Order: Psocodea
- Family: Psocidae
- Tribe: Ptyctini
- Genus: Trichadenotecnum
- Species: T. alexanderae

Binomial name
- Trichadenotecnum alexanderae Sommerman, 1948

= Trichadenotecnum alexanderae =

Species of booklouse

Trichadenotecnum alexanderae is a species of common barklouse in the family Psocidae. It is found in North America.
