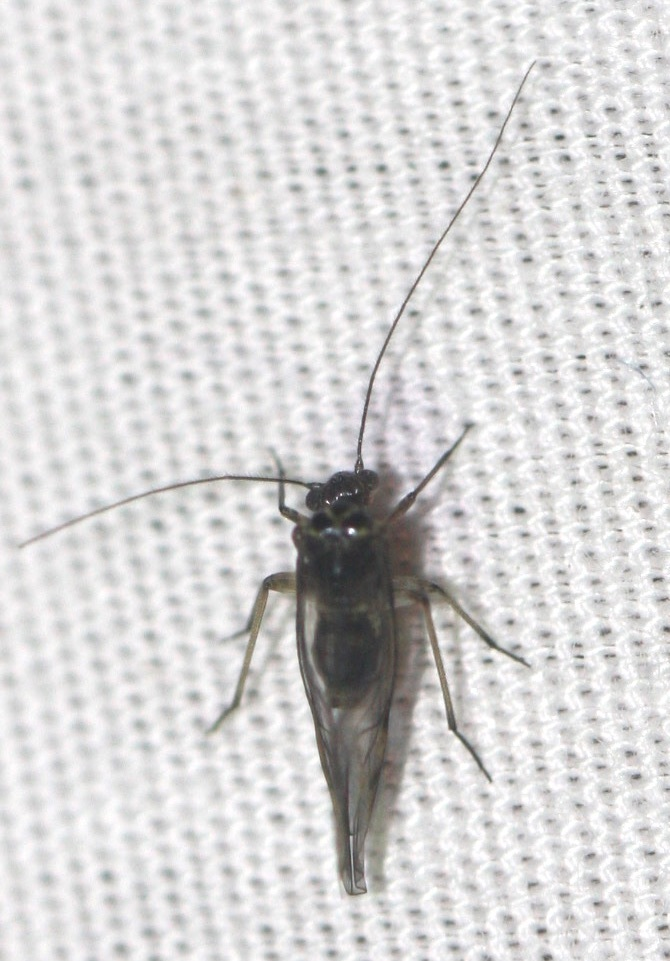

Scientific classification
- Kingdom: Animalia
- Phylum: Arthropoda
- Clade: Pancrustacea
- Class: Insecta
- Order: Psocodea
- Family: Psocidae
- Tribe: Ptyctini
- Genus: Indiopsocus
- Species: I. infumatus

Binomial name
- Indiopsocus infumatus (Banks, 1907)

= Indiopsocus infumatus =

Species of booklouse

Indiopsocus infumatus is a species of common barklouse in the family Psocidae. It is found in North America.
