= Trichadenotecnum circularoides =

Scientific classification
- Domain: Eukaryota
- Kingdom: Animalia
- Phylum: Arthropoda
- Class: Insecta
- Order: Psocodea
- Family: Psocidae
- Tribe: Ptyctini
- Genus: Trichadenotecnum
- Species: T. circularoides

Binomial name
- Trichadenotecnum circularoides Badonnel, 1955

Species of booklouse

Trichadenotecnum circularoides is a species of common barklouse in the family Psocidae. It is found in Africa, Europe and Northern Asia (excluding China), North America, South America, and Southern Asia.
