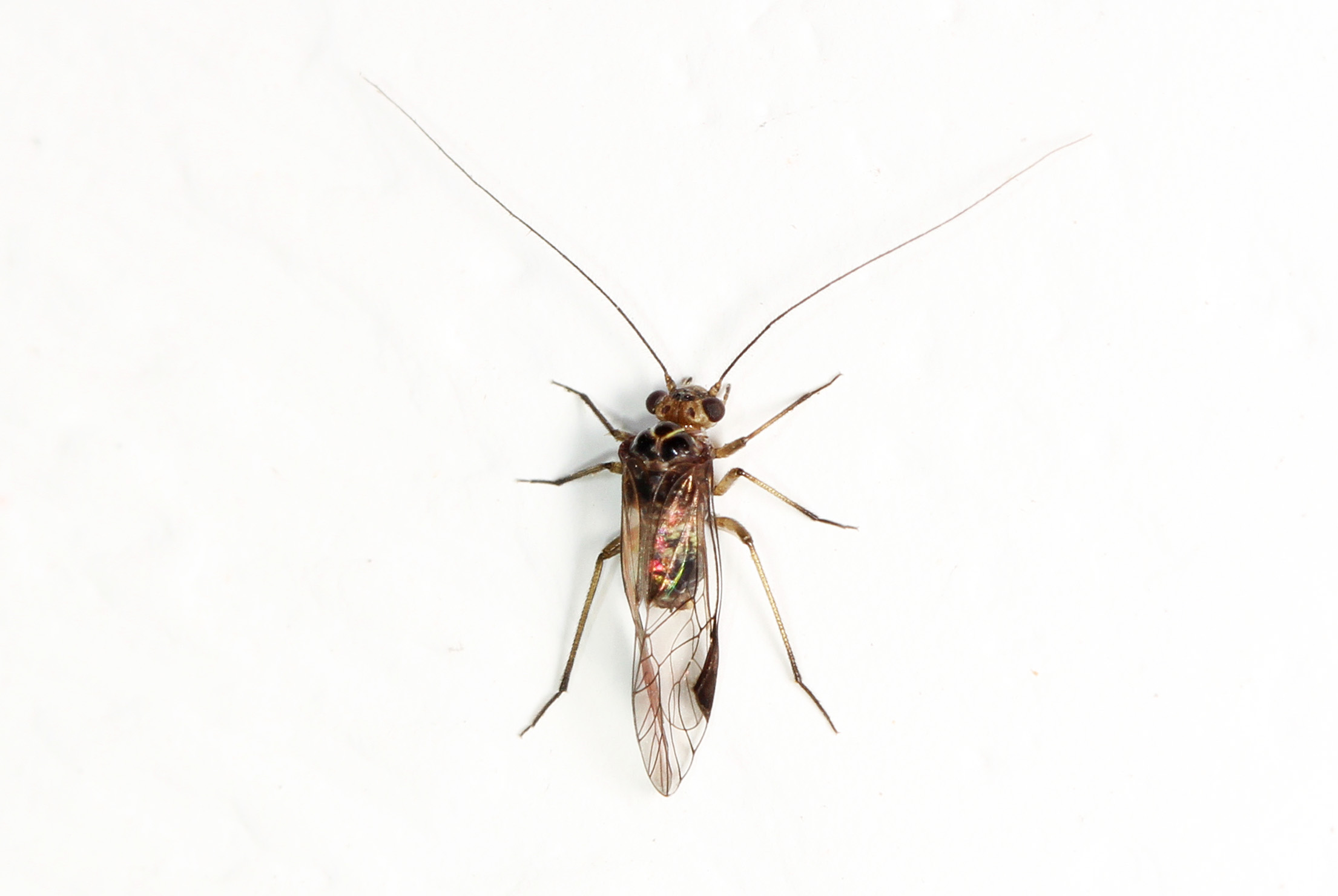

Scientific classification
- Domain: Eukaryota
- Kingdom: Animalia
- Phylum: Arthropoda
- Class: Insecta
- Order: Psocodea
- Family: Psocidae
- Subfamily: Psocinae
- Genus: Metylophorus
- Species: M. novaescotiae

Binomial name
- Metylophorus novaescotiae (Walker, 1853)

= Metylophorus novaescotiae =

Species of booklouse

Metylophorus novaescotiae is a species of common barklouse in the family Psocidae. It is found in Central America and North America.
