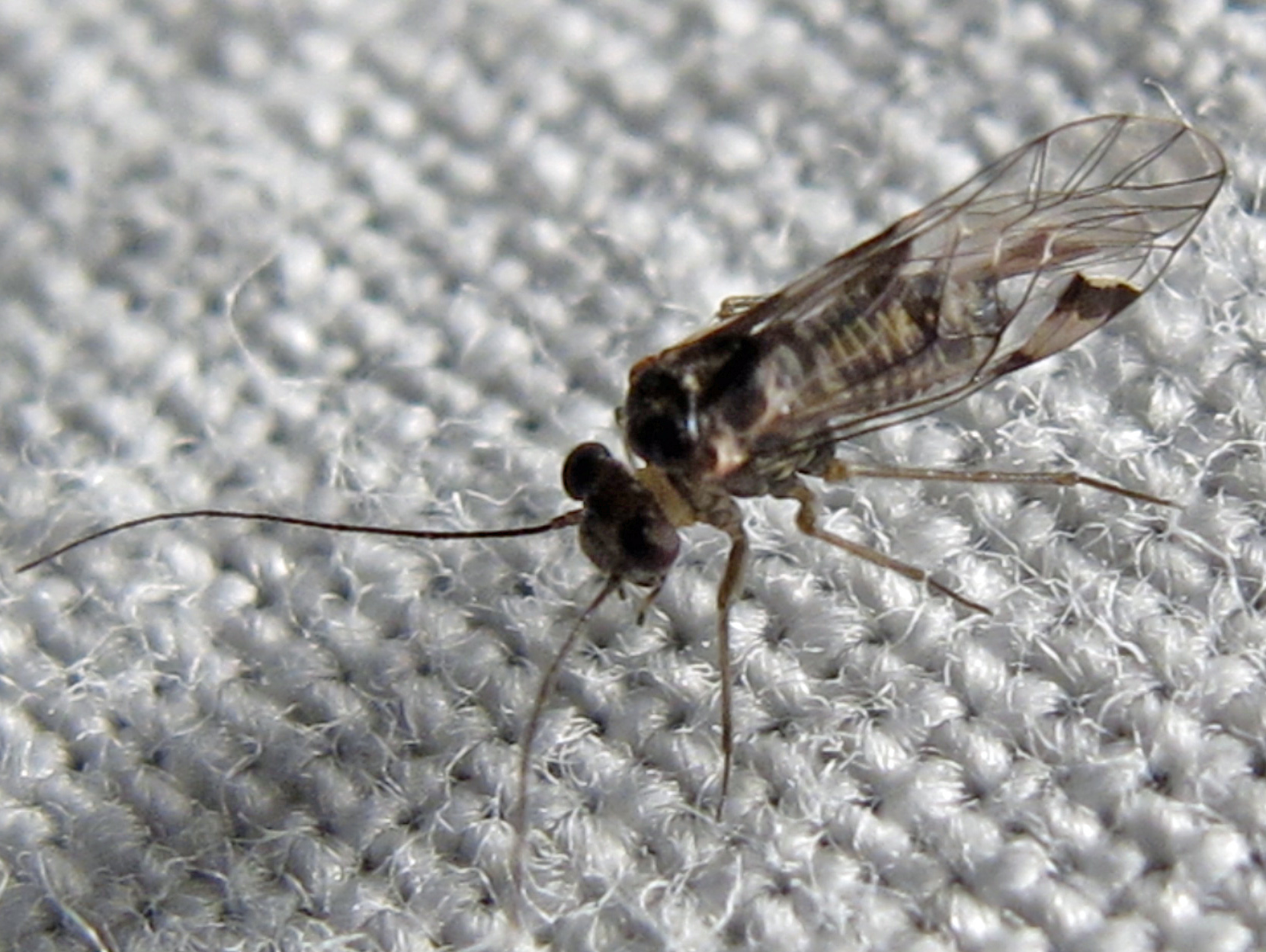

Scientific classification
- Domain: Eukaryota
- Kingdom: Animalia
- Phylum: Arthropoda
- Class: Insecta
- Order: Psocodea
- Family: Psocidae
- Tribe: Ptyctini
- Genus: Indiopsocus
- Species: I. bisignatus

Binomial name
- Indiopsocus bisignatus (Banks, 1904)

= Indiopsocus bisignatus =

Species of booklouse

Indiopsocus bisignatus is a species of common barklouse in the family Psocidae, where it is found in Central America and North America.
