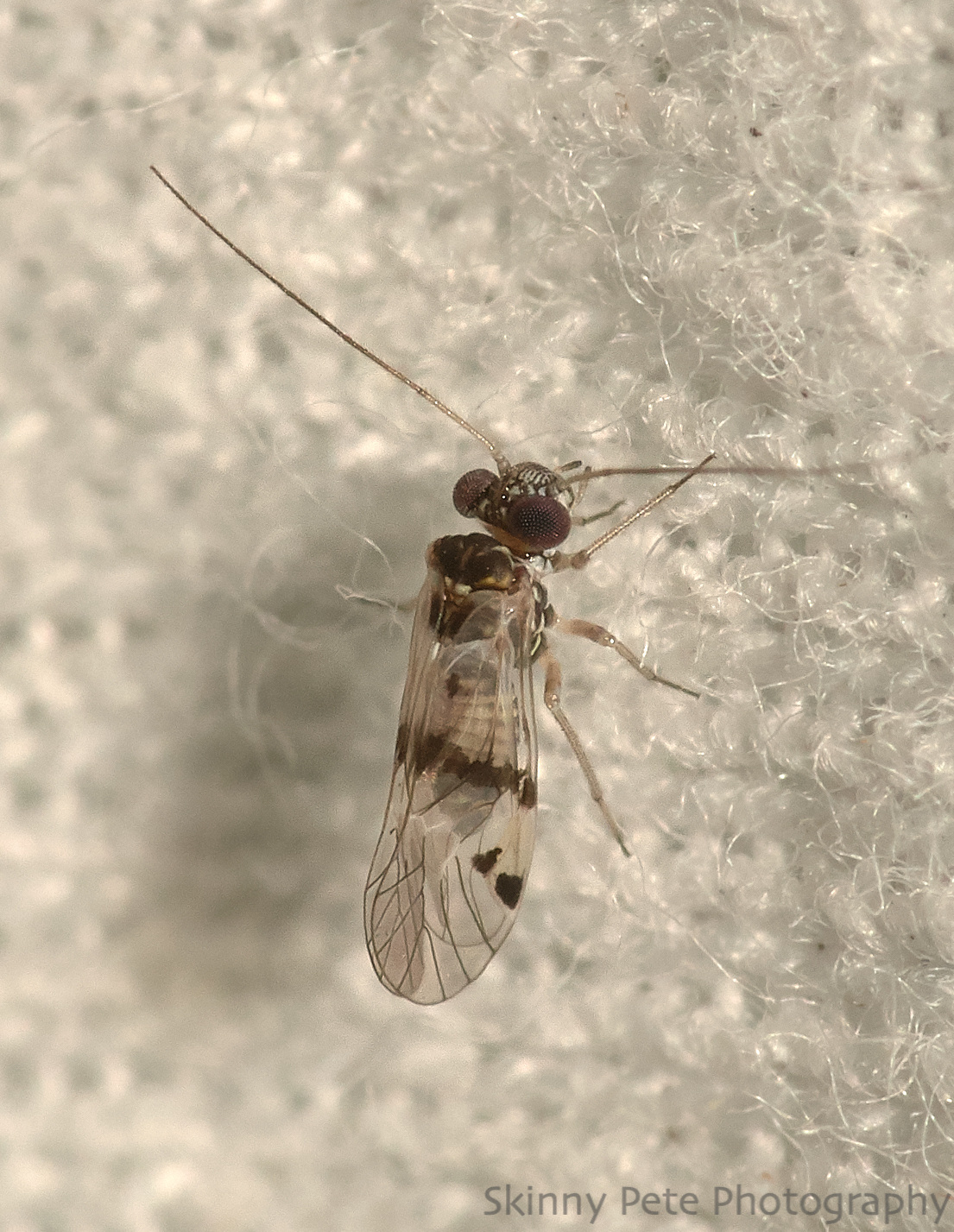

Scientific classification
- Kingdom: Animalia
- Phylum: Arthropoda
- Clade: Pancrustacea
- Class: Insecta
- Order: Psocodea
- Family: Psocidae
- Tribe: Ptyctini
- Genus: Indiopsocus
- Species: I. ceterus

Binomial name
- Indiopsocus ceterus Mockford, 1974

= Indiopsocus ceterus =

Species of booklouse

Indiopsocus ceterus is a species of common barklouse in the family Psocidae. It is found in the Caribbean Sea and North America.
