= Steleops elegans =

Scientific classification
- Domain: Eukaryota
- Kingdom: Animalia
- Phylum: Arthropoda
- Class: Insecta
- Order: Psocodea
- Family: Psocidae
- Tribe: Ptyctini
- Genus: Steleops
- Species: S. elegans

Binomial name
- Steleops elegans (Banks, 1904)

Species of booklouse

Steleops elegans is a species of common barklouse in the family Psocidae. It is found in North America.
