= List of Ptycta species =

This is a list of 157 species in Ptycta, a genus of common barklice in the family Psocidae.

== Ptycta species ==
- Ptycta aaroni Thornton, 1984^{c g}
- Ptycta afasciata Endang, Thornton & New, 2002^{c g}
- Ptycta anacantha Badonnel, 1967^{c g}
- Ptycta angulata Thornton, S. S. Lee & Chui, 1972^{c g}
- Ptycta angustifrons (Enderlein, 1931)^{c g}
- Ptycta apicalis Broadhead & Alison Richards, 1980^{c g}
- Ptycta apicantha Thornton, 1984^{c g}
- Ptycta apicanthoides Thornton, 1984^{c g}
- Ptycta arandae Baz, 1990^{c g}
- Ptycta aschekei Turner, B. D., 1976^{c g}
- Ptycta australis Schmidt, E. R. & Thornton, 1993^{c g}
- Ptycta badonneli (Roesler, 1943)^{c g}
- Ptycta bebea Thornton, 1981^{c g}
- Ptycta biloba Smithers, Courtenay, 1999^{c g}
- Ptycta blanci Badonnel, 1976^{c g}
- Ptycta breuschi Smithers, Courtenay & Thornton, 1990^{c g}
- Ptycta buettikeri Badonnel, 1982^{c g}
- Ptycta bulbosa Badonnel, 1969^{c g}
- Ptycta caboverdensis Meinander, 1966^{c g}
- Ptycta campbelli Schmidt, E. R. & Thornton, 1993^{c g}
- Ptycta chekei Turner, B. D., 1976^{c g}
- Ptycta cogani New, 1977^{c g}
- Ptycta colei Schmidt, E. R. & New, 2008^{c g}
- Ptycta cruciata Badonnel, 1979^{c g}
- Ptycta curvata Li, Fasheng, 2002^{c g}
- Ptycta curviclava Broadhead & Alison Richards, 1980^{c g}
- Ptycta deltoides Li, Fasheng, 1992^{c g}
- Ptycta descarpentriesi Badonnel, 1976^{c g}
- Ptycta diacantha Thornton, 1984^{c g}
- Ptycta diadela Thornton, 1984^{c g}
- Ptycta diastema Thornton, 1984^{c g}
- Ptycta dichotoma Broadhead & Alison Richards, 1980^{c g}
- Ptycta dicrosa Thornton, 1984^{c g}
- Ptycta disclera Thornton, 1984^{c g}
- Ptycta distincta Smithers, Courtenay & Thornton, 1990^{c g}
- Ptycta distinguenda (Perkins, 1899)^{c g}
- Ptycta drepana Thornton, 1984^{c g}
- Ptycta elegantula Li, Fasheng, 1999^{c g}
- Ptycta elena New & Thornton, 1975^{c g}
- Ptycta emarginata New, 1974^{c g}
- Ptycta enderleini (Roesler, 1943)^{c g}
- Ptycta episcia Thornton, 1984^{c g}
- Ptycta flavipalpi Li, Fasheng & Chikun Yang, 1987^{c g}
- Ptycta floresensis Endang, Thornton & New, 2002^{c g}
- Ptycta frayorgensis New & Thornton, 1981^{c g}
- Ptycta freycineti Schmidt, E. R. & New, 2008^{c g}
- Ptycta frogneri Thornton, 1984^{c g}
- Ptycta frontalis Thornton, 1984^{c g}
- Ptycta furcata Li, Fasheng, 1993^{c g}
- Ptycta giffardi Thornton, 1984^{c g}
- Ptycta glossoptera New, 1974^{c g}
- Ptycta grucheti Turner, B. D., 1976^{c g}
- Ptycta gynegonia Thornton, 1984^{c g}
- Ptycta gyroflexa Li, Fasheng, 2001^{c g}
- Ptycta haleakalae (Perkins, 1899)^{c g}
- Ptycta hardyi Thornton, 1984^{c g}
- Ptycta hawaiiensis Thornton, 1984^{c g}
- Ptycta heterogamias (Perkins, 1899)^{c g}
- Ptycta hollowayae Smithers, Courtenay, 1984^{c g}
- Ptycta iaoensis Thornton, 1984^{c g}
- Ptycta improcera New, 1974^{c g}
- Ptycta incerta Smithers, Courtenay & Thornton, 1990^{c g}
- Ptycta incurvata Thornton, 1960^{c g}
- Ptycta isabelae Smithers, Courtenay & Thornton, 1990^{c g}
- Ptycta johnsoni Bess, E. C. & Yoshizawa, 2007^{c g}
- Ptycta kaala Thornton, 1984^{c g}
- Ptycta kauaiensis (Perkins, 1899)^{c g}
- Ptycta kenyensis New, 1975^{c g}
- Ptycta kiboschoensis (Enderlein, 1907)^{c g}
- Ptycta krakatau Cole, New & Thornton, 1989^{c g}
- Ptycta laevidorsum (Enderlein, 1931)^{c g}
- Ptycta lanaiensis (Perkins, 1899)^{c g}
- Ptycta lemniscata (Smithers, Courtenay, 1964)^{c g}
- Ptycta leucothorax Thornton, 1984^{c g}
- Ptycta lineata Mockford, 1974^{i c g}
- Ptycta lobata (Badonnel, 1955)^{c g}
- Ptycta lobophora Thornton, 1984^{i c g}
- Ptycta longicaulis Li, Fasheng, 1992^{c g}
- Ptycta longipennis Smithers, Courtenay, 1984^{c g}
- Ptycta longispinosa (Smithers, Courtenay, 1964)^{c g}
- Ptycta lugosensis Smithers, Courtenay & Thornton, 1990^{c g}
- Ptycta lunulata New, 1972^{c g}
- Ptycta maculata Thornton, S. S. Lee & Chui, 1972^{c g}
- Ptycta maculifrons Thornton, 1984^{c g}
- Ptycta maculosa Badonnel, 1967^{c g}
- Ptycta marianensis Thornton, S. S. Lee & Chui, 1972^{c g}
- Ptycta marta Thornton & A. K. T. Woo, 1973^{c g}
- Ptycta merapiensis Endang, Thornton & New, 2002^{c g}
- Ptycta microctena Thornton, 1984^{c g}
- Ptycta microglena Thornton, 1984^{c g}
- Ptycta micromaculata Thornton, S. S. Lee & Chui, 1972^{c g}
- Ptycta molokaiensis (Perkins, 1899)^{c g}
- Ptycta monticola (Perkins, 1899)^{c g}
- Ptycta muogamarra Smithers, Courtenay, 1977^{c g}
- Ptycta nadleri Galil, 1981^{c g}
- Ptycta nitens Thornton, S. S. Lee & Chui, 1972^{c g}
- Ptycta novohibernica Smithers, Courtenay & Thornton, 1990^{c g}
- Ptycta oahuensis (Perkins, 1899)^{c g}
- Ptycta obscura Broadhead & Alison Richards, 1980^{c g}
- Ptycta oceanica New, 1977^{c g}
- Ptycta oligocantha Thornton, 1984^{c g}
- Ptycta palikea Thornton, 1984^{c g}
- Ptycta pallawahensis Schmidt, E. R. & New, 2008^{c g}
- Ptycta pallida Badonnel, 1967^{c g}
- Ptycta paralobata New, 1975^{c g}
- Ptycta pardena Thornton, 1984^{c g}
- Ptycta parvidentata Tsutsumi, 1964^{c g}
- Ptycta parvula Thornton, S. S. Lee & Chui, 1972^{c g}
- Ptycta pauliani Badonnel, 1967^{c g}
- Ptycta pearmani New, 1972^{c g}
- Ptycta pedina Thornton, 1984^{c g}
- Ptycta peleae Thornton, 1984^{c g}
- Ptycta perkinsi Thornton, 1984^{c g}
- Ptycta persimilis Thornton, 1984^{c g}
- Ptycta picta New, 1974^{c g}
- Ptycta pikeloi Thornton, 1984^{c g}
- Ptycta pitallo Endang, Thornton & New, 2002^{c g}
- Ptycta placophora Thornton, 1984^{c g}
- Ptycta platyclava Broadhead & Alison Richards, 1980^{c g}
- Ptycta polluta (Walsh, 1862)^{i c g b}
- Ptycta polyacantha Badonnel, 1967^{c g}
- Ptycta precincta Thornton, 1984^{c g}
- Ptycta prosta Schmidt, E. R. & Thornton, 1993^{c g}
- Ptycta pulchra Turner, B. D., 1976^{c g}
- Ptycta pupukea Thornton, 1984^{c g}
- Ptycta quadrimaculata (Smithers, Courtenay, 1964)^{c g}
- Ptycta recava Bess, E. C. & Yoshizawa, 2007^{c g}
- Ptycta reticulata New, 1972^{c g}
- Ptycta revoluta Li, Fasheng, 2002^{c g}
- Ptycta rhina Thornton, 1984^{c g}
- Ptycta sardjani Endang & Thornton, 1992^{c g}
- Ptycta schillei (Enderlein, 1906)^{c g}
- Ptycta schisma Thornton, 1984^{c g}
- Ptycta schneideri Badonnel, 1981^{c g}
- Ptycta serrata Endang, Thornton & New, 2002^{c g}
- Ptycta seyrigi (Badonnel, 1935)^{c g}
- Ptycta simulator (Perkins, 1899)^{c g}
- Ptycta stena Thornton, 1984^{c g}
- Ptycta stenomedia Thornton, 1984^{c g}
- Ptycta striatoptera New, 1975^{c g}
- Ptycta swezeyi Thornton, 1984^{c g}
- Ptycta sylvestris (Perkins, 1899)^{c g}
- Ptycta tachardiae Badonnel, 1967^{c g}
- Ptycta tapensis Endang, Thornton & New, 2002^{c g}
- Ptycta telma Thornton, 1984^{c g}
- Ptycta tikala (Mockford, 1957)^{c g}
- Ptycta timorensis Endang, Thornton & New, 2002^{c g}
- Ptycta trullifera Smithers, Courtenay, 1998^{c g}
- Ptycta tsutsumii New & Thornton, 1976^{c g}
- Ptycta umbrata New, 1974^{c g}
- Ptycta unica (Perkins, 1899)^{c g}
- Ptycta vaga New, 1975^{c g}
- Ptycta verticalis Vaughan, Thornton & New, 1991^{c g}
- Ptycta vittipennis (Perkins, 1899)^{c g}
- Ptycta williamsorum Smithers, Courtenay, 1997^{c g}
- Ptycta ypsilon Broadhead & Alison Richards, 1980^{c g}
- Ptycta zimmermani Thornton, 1984^{c g}

Data sources: i = ITIS, c = Catalogue of Life, g = GBIF, b = Bugguide.net
