= Indiopsocus campestris =

Scientific classification
- Domain: Eukaryota
- Kingdom: Animalia
- Phylum: Arthropoda
- Class: Insecta
- Order: Psocodea
- Family: Psocidae
- Tribe: Ptyctini
- Genus: Indiopsocus
- Species: I. campestris

Binomial name
- Indiopsocus campestris (Aaron, 1886)

Species of booklouse

Indiopsocus campestris is a species of common barklouse in the family Psocidae. It is found in the Caribbean Sea and North America.
