= Trichadenotecnum majus =

Scientific classification
- Domain: Eukaryota
- Kingdom: Animalia
- Phylum: Arthropoda
- Class: Insecta
- Order: Psocodea
- Family: Psocidae
- Tribe: Ptyctini
- Genus: Trichadenotecnum
- Species: T. majus

Binomial name
- Trichadenotecnum majus (Kolbe, 1880)

Species of booklouse

Trichadenotecnum majus is a species of common barklouse in the family Psocidae. It is found in Europe and Northern Asia (excluding China) and North America.
