= Camelopsocus tucsonensis =

Scientific classification
- Domain: Eukaryota
- Kingdom: Animalia
- Phylum: Arthropoda
- Class: Insecta
- Order: Psocodea
- Family: Psocidae
- Tribe: Ptyctini
- Genus: Camelopsocus
- Species: C. tucsonensis

Binomial name
- Camelopsocus tucsonensis Mockford, 1984

Species of booklouse

Camelopsocus tucsonensis is a species of common barklouse in the family Psocidae. It is found in North America.
