= Trichadenotecnum castum =

Scientific classification
- Domain: Eukaryota
- Kingdom: Animalia
- Phylum: Arthropoda
- Class: Insecta
- Order: Psocodea
- Family: Psocidae
- Tribe: Ptyctini
- Genus: Trichadenotecnum
- Species: T. castum

Binomial name
- Trichadenotecnum castum Betz, 1983

Species of booklouse

Trichadenotecnum castum is a species of common barklouse in the family Psocidae. It is found in Europe and Northern Asia (excluding China) and North America.
