= Loensia conspersa =

Scientific classification
- Domain: Eukaryota
- Kingdom: Animalia
- Phylum: Arthropoda
- Class: Insecta
- Order: Psocodea
- Family: Psocidae
- Tribe: Ptyctini
- Genus: Loensia
- Species: L. conspersa

Binomial name
- Loensia conspersa (Banks, 1903)

Species of booklouse

Loensia conspersa is a species of common barklouse in the family Psocidae. It is found in North America.
