= Camelopsocus similis =

Scientific classification
- Domain: Eukaryota
- Kingdom: Animalia
- Phylum: Arthropoda
- Class: Insecta
- Order: Psocodea
- Family: Psocidae
- Tribe: Ptyctini
- Genus: Camelopsocus
- Species: C. similis

Binomial name
- Camelopsocus similis Mockford, 1965

Species of booklouse

Camelopsocus similis is a species of common barklouse in the family Psocidae. It is found in Central America and North America.
