= Trichadenotecnum slossonae =

Scientific classification
- Domain: Eukaryota
- Kingdom: Animalia
- Phylum: Arthropoda
- Class: Insecta
- Order: Psocodea
- Family: Psocidae
- Tribe: Ptyctini
- Genus: Trichadenotecnum
- Species: T. slossonae

Binomial name
- Trichadenotecnum slossonae (Banks, 1903)

Species of booklouse

Trichadenotecnum slossonae is a species of common barklouse in the family Psocidae. It is found in Central America and North America.
