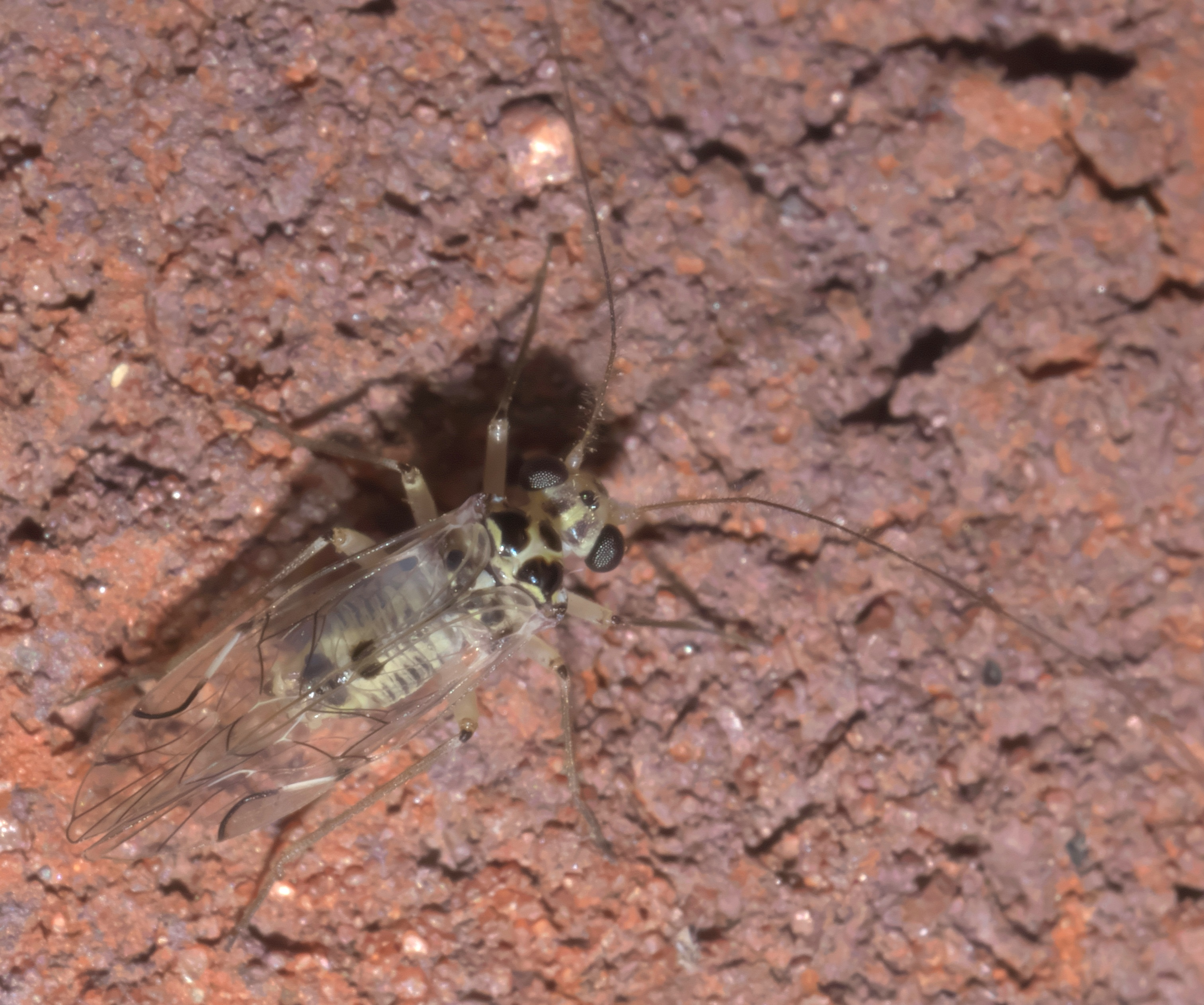

Scientific classification
- Domain: Eukaryota
- Kingdom: Animalia
- Phylum: Arthropoda
- Class: Insecta
- Order: Psocodea
- Family: Psocidae
- Subfamily: Psocinae
- Genus: Metylophorus
- Species: M. purus

Binomial name
- Metylophorus purus (Walsh, 1862)

= Metylophorus purus =

Species of booklouse

Metylophorus purus is a species of common barklouse in the family Psocidae. It is found in North America.

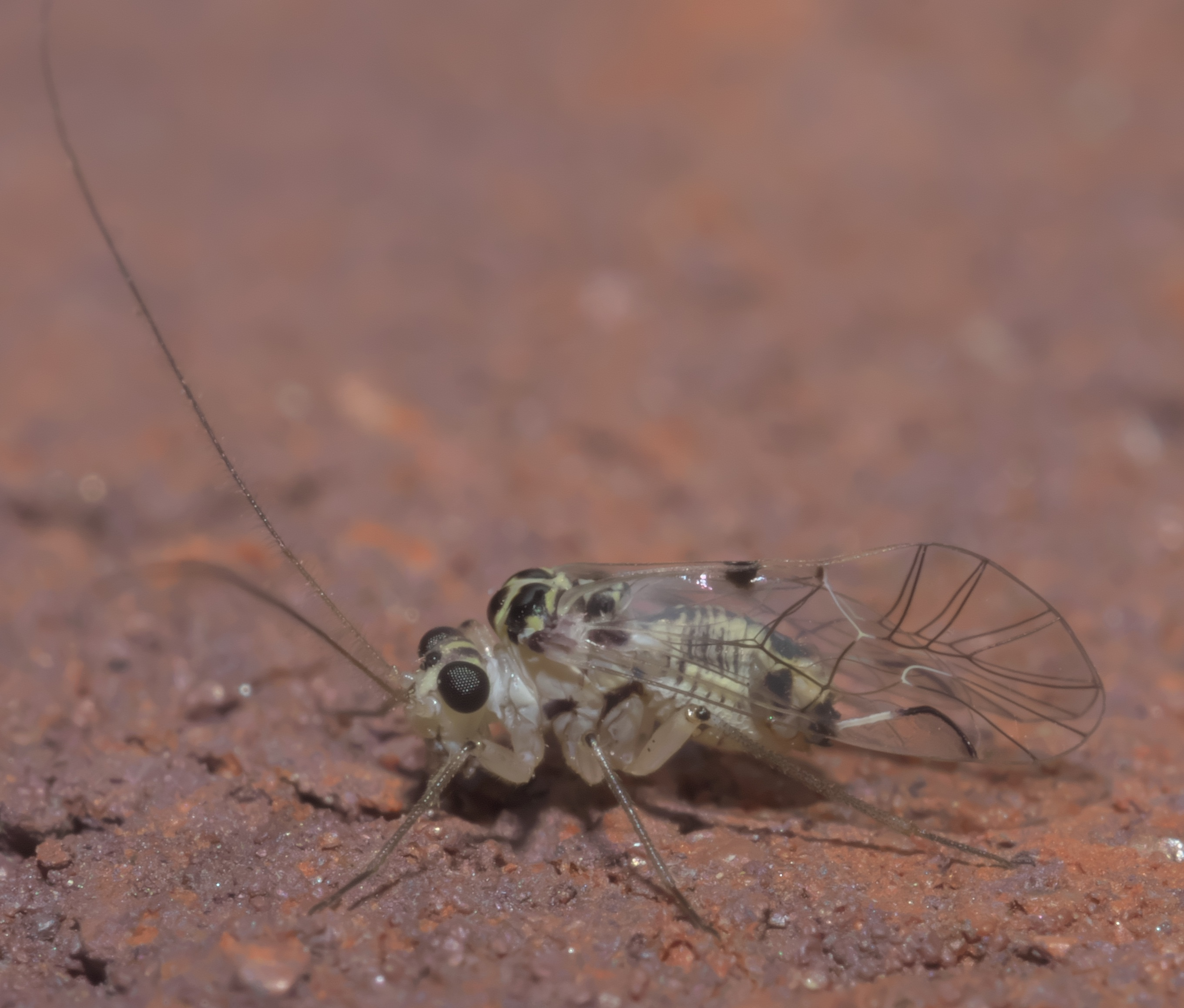

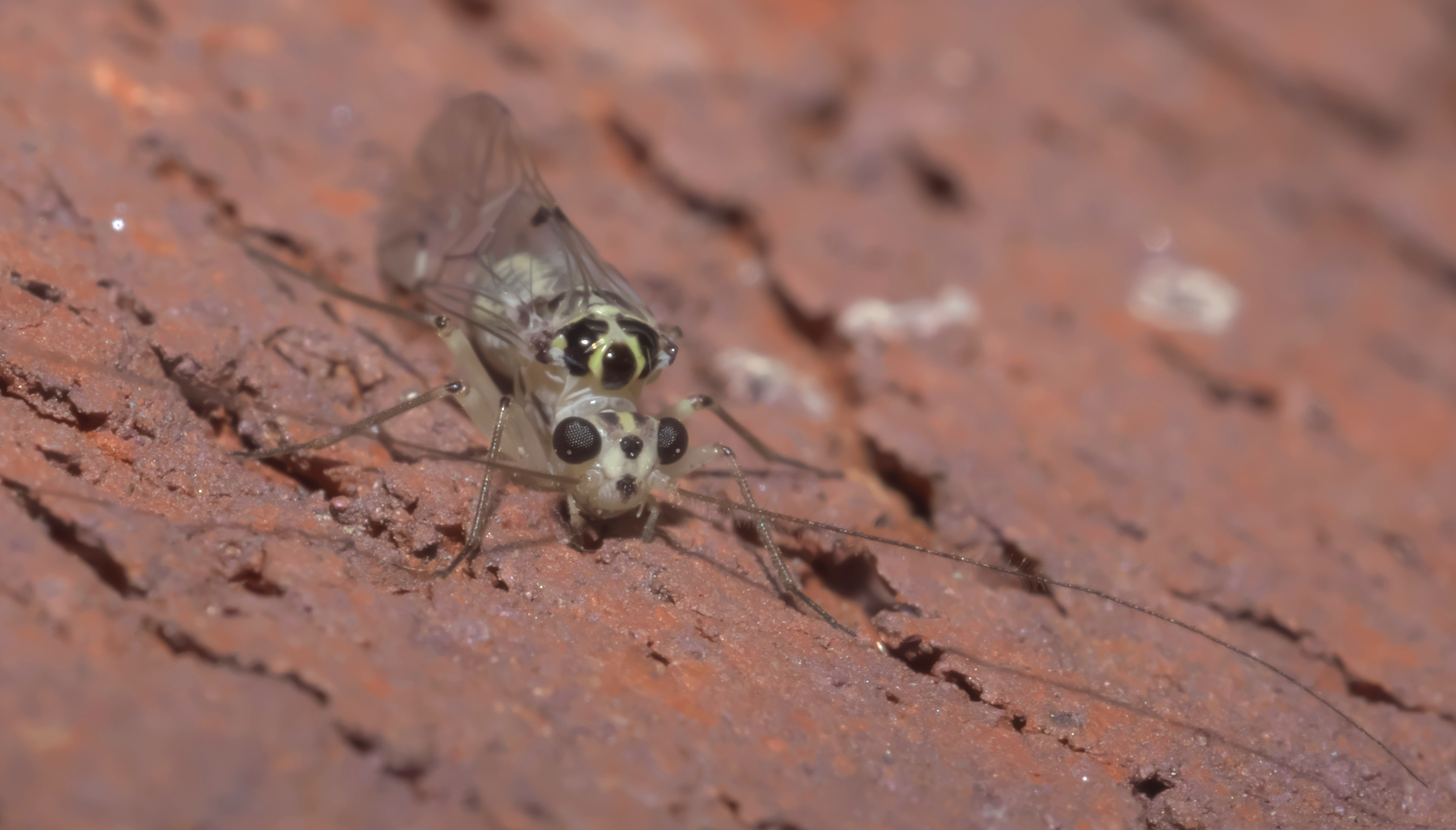
