= Trichadenotecnum quaesitum =

Scientific classification
- Domain: Eukaryota
- Kingdom: Animalia
- Phylum: Arthropoda
- Class: Insecta
- Order: Psocodea
- Family: Psocidae
- Tribe: Ptyctini
- Genus: Trichadenotecnum
- Species: T. quaesitum

Binomial name
- Trichadenotecnum quaesitum (Chapman, 1930)

Species of booklouse

Trichadenotecnum quaesitum is a species of common barklouse in the family Psocidae. It is found in North America.
