= Metylophorus barretti =

Scientific classification
- Domain: Eukaryota
- Kingdom: Animalia
- Phylum: Arthropoda
- Class: Insecta
- Order: Psocodea
- Family: Psocidae
- Subfamily: Psocinae
- Genus: Metylophorus
- Species: M. barretti

Binomial name
- Metylophorus barretti (Banks, 1900)

Species of booklouse

Metylophorus barretti is a species of common barklouse in the family Psocidae. It is found in Central America and North America.
