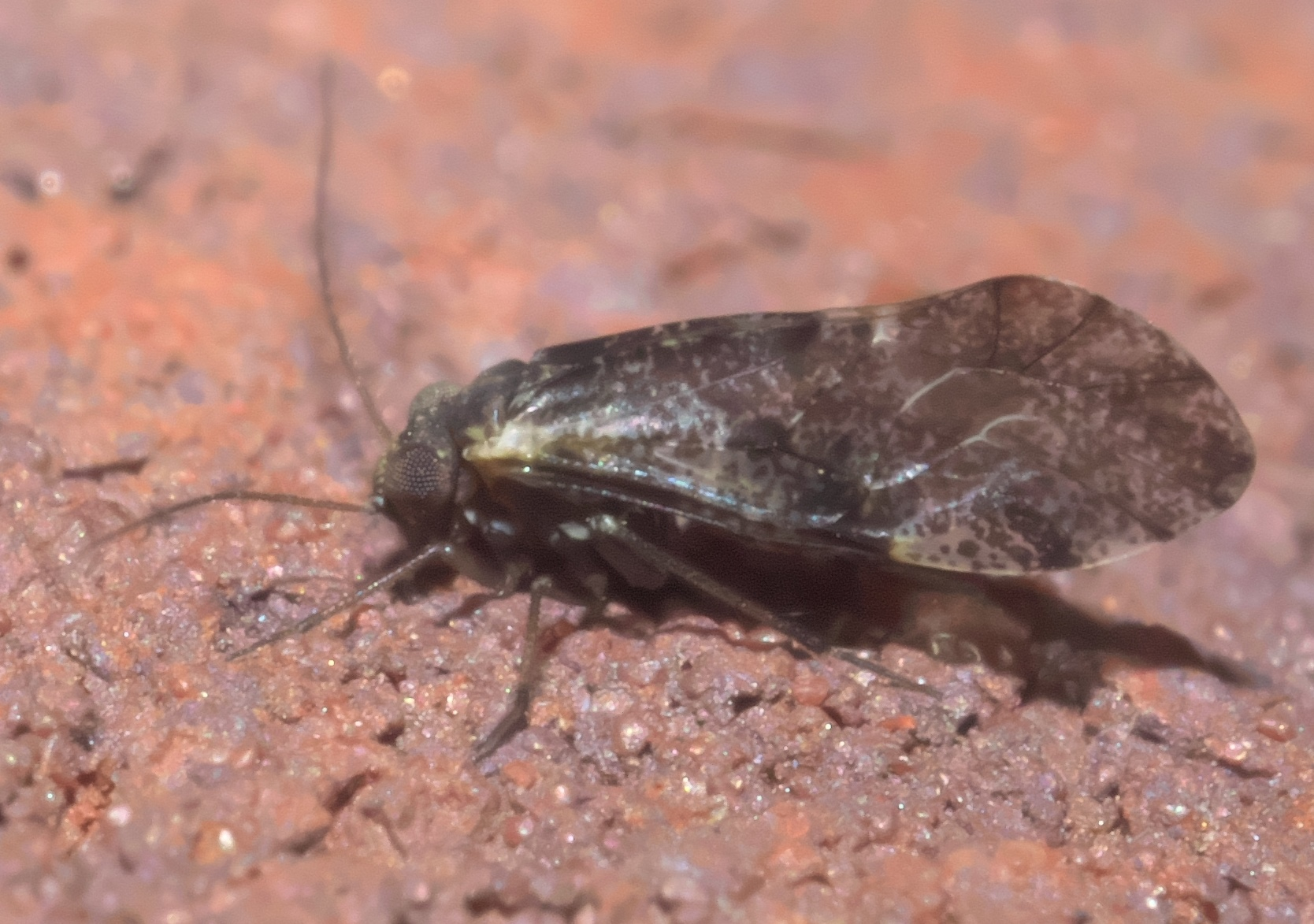
- Loensia moesta

Scientific classification
- Domain: Eukaryota
- Kingdom: Animalia
- Phylum: Arthropoda
- Class: Insecta
- Order: Psocodea
- Family: Psocidae
- Subfamily: Psocinae
- Tribe: Ptyctini
- Genus: Loensia; Enderlein, 1924

= Loensia =

Genus of booklice

Loensia is a genus of common barklice in the family Psocidae. There are more than 30 described species in Loensia.

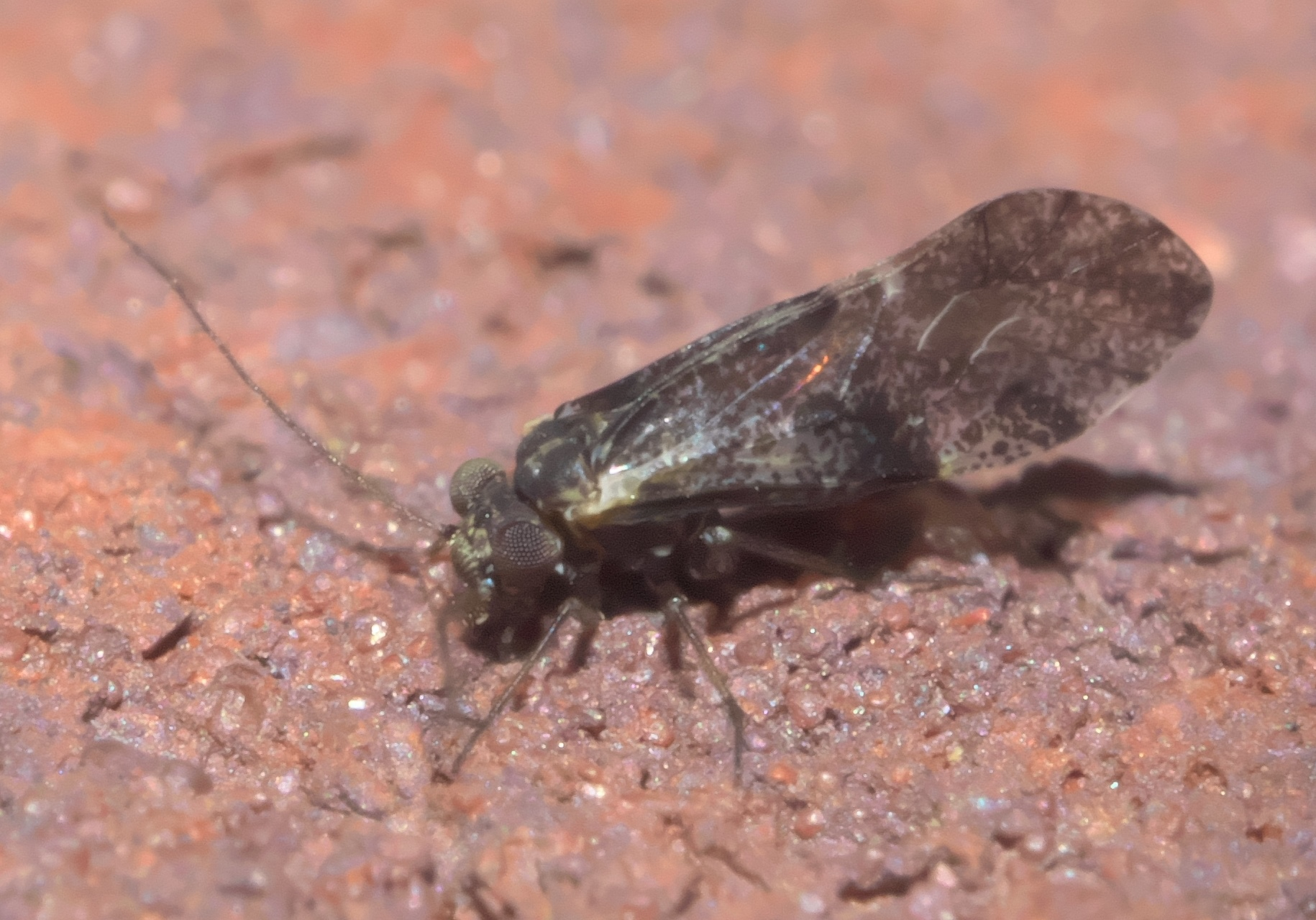
Loensia moesta

== Species ==
These 33 species belong to the genus Loensia:

- Loensia bannaensis Li, 2002
- Loensia beijingensis Li, 2002
- Loensia bicolor (Enderlein, 1900)
- Loensia bidens Li, 2002
- Loensia bifurcata (Li, 1992)
- Loensia binalis Li, 2002
- Loensia conspersa (Banks, 1903)
- Loensia corollidenta Li, 2001
- Loensia dolabrata Li, 2002
- Loensia excrescens Li, 1997
- Loensia falcata Li, 1997
- Loensia fasciata (Fabricius, 1787)
- Loensia folivalva Li, 2002
- Loensia fuscimacula Enderlein, 1926
- Loensia glabridorsum Enderlein, 1926
- Loensia guangdongica Li, 2002
- Loensia infundibularis (Li, 1989)
- Loensia longicaudata Li, 2005
- Loensia maculosa (Banks, 1908)
- Loensia media Li, 2002
- Loensia moesta (Hagen, 1861)
- Loensia pearmani Kimmins, 1941
- Loensia pycnacantha Li, 2002
- Loensia rectangula Li, 2002
- Loensia schoenemanni Enderlein, 1926
- Loensia scrobicularis Li, 2002
- Loensia sexcornuta Li, 2001
- Loensia spicata Li, 1995
- Loensia spissa Li, 1995
- Loensia stigmatoidea (Li, 1993)
- Loensia taeniana (Li & Yang, 1987)
- Loensia teretiuscula (Li & Yang, 1987)
- Loensia variegata (Latreille, 1799)
