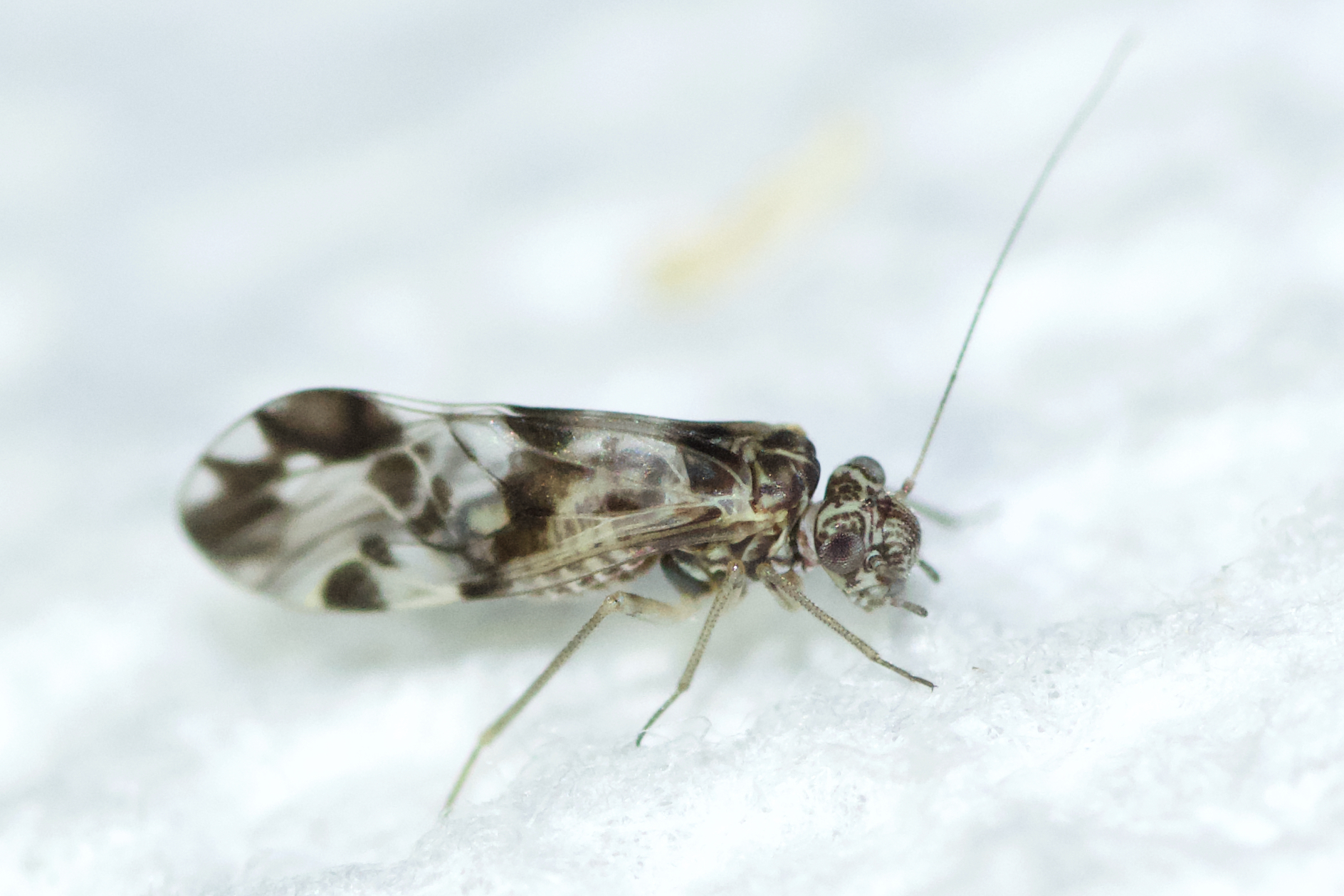
- Ptycta polluta

Scientific classification
- Domain: Eukaryota
- Kingdom: Animalia
- Phylum: Arthropoda
- Class: Insecta
- Order: Psocodea
- Family: Psocidae
- Subfamily: Psocinae
- Tribe: Ptyctini
- Genus: Ptycta; Enderlein, 1925

Diversity
- at least 150 species

= Ptycta =

Genus of booklice

Ptycta is a genus of common barklice in the family Psocidae. There are more than 150 described species in Ptycta.

== See also ==
- List of Ptycta species
