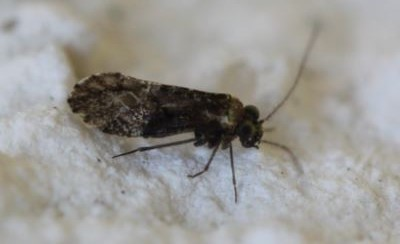

Scientific classification
- Kingdom: Animalia
- Phylum: Arthropoda
- Class: Insecta
- Order: Psocodea
- Family: Psocidae
- Genus: Loensia
- Species: L. variegata

Binomial name
- Loensia variegata (Latreille, 1799)

= Loensia variegata =

Species of booklouse

Loensia variegata is a species of Psocoptera from the family Psocidae that can be found in Great Britain and Ireland. The species are yellowish-black.

== Habitat ==
The species feed on ash, beech, birch, hawthorn, oak, and yew. It also likes to feed on apples, pears, and plums.
