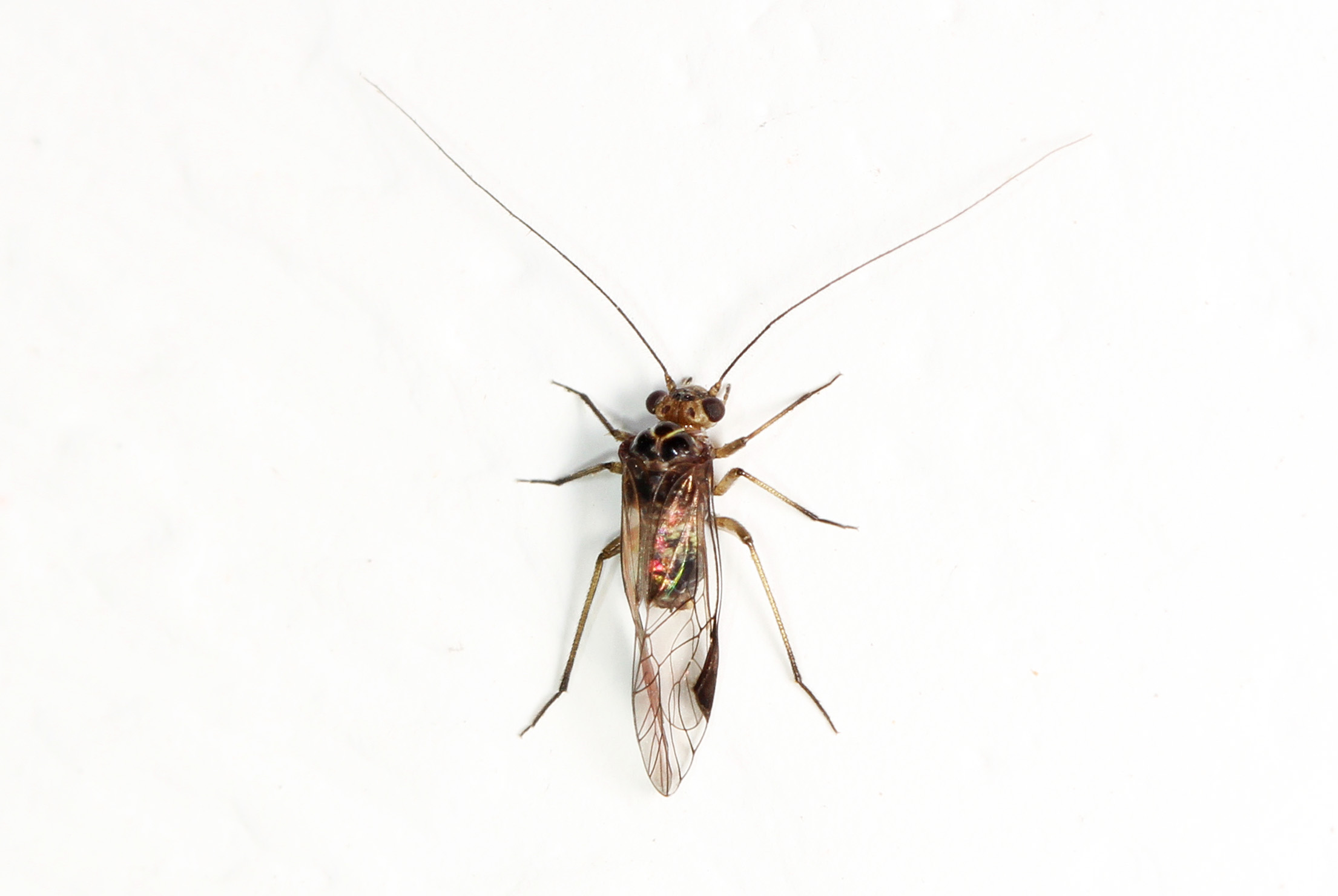
- Metylophorus novaescotiae

Scientific classification
- Domain: Eukaryota
- Kingdom: Animalia
- Phylum: Arthropoda
- Class: Insecta
- Order: Psocodea
- Family: Psocidae
- Subfamily: Psocinae
- Genus: Metylophorus; Pearman, 1932

= Metylophorus =

Genus of booklice

Metylophorus is a genus of common barklice in the family Psocidae. There are at least 50 described species in Metylophorus.

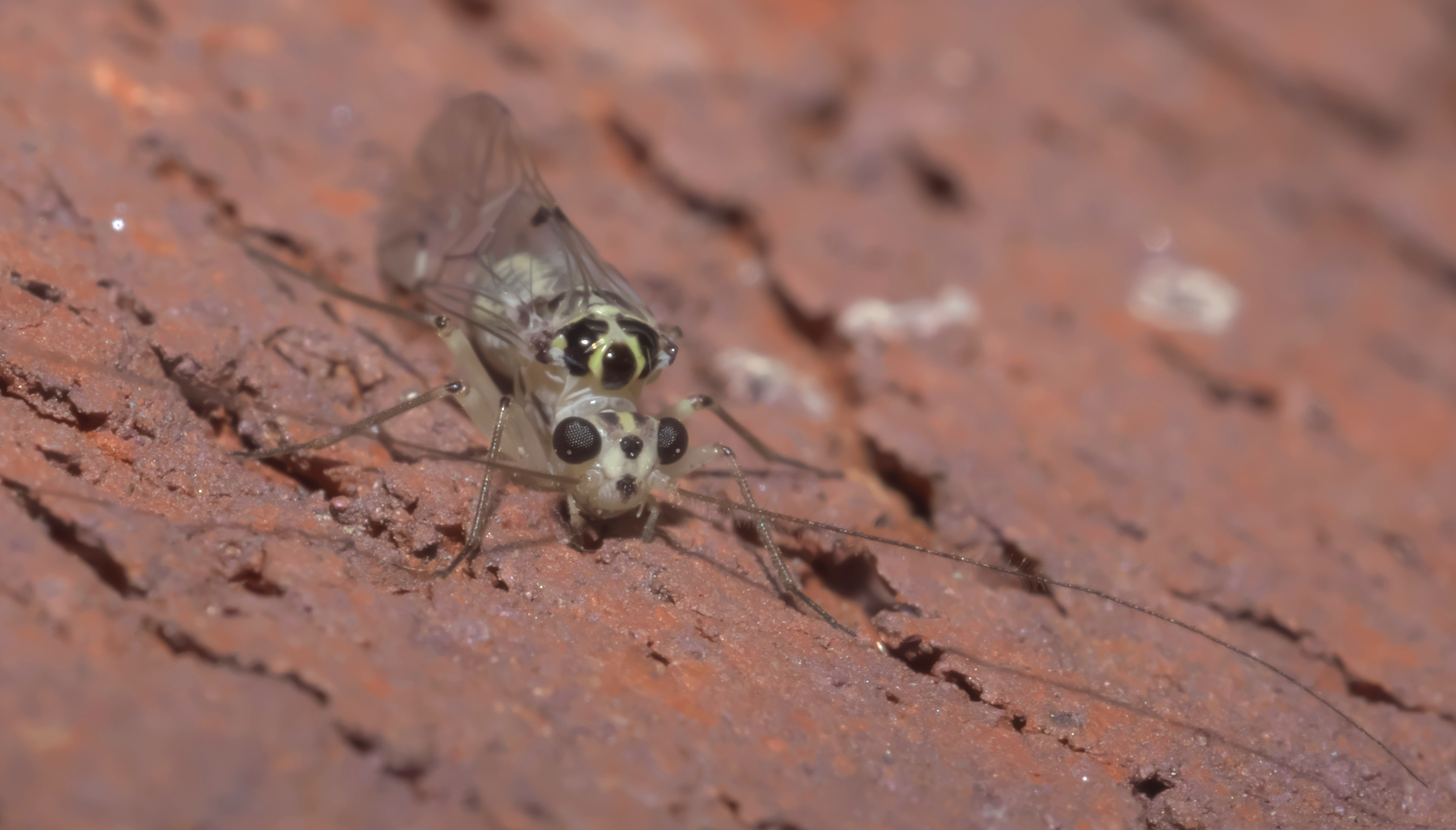
Metylophorus purus

== Species ==
These 50 species belong to the genus Metylophorus:

- Metylophorus barretti (Banks, 1900)
- Metylophorus bicornutus Li & Yang, 1987
- Metylophorus bishopi New, 1972
- Metylophorus brevantenninus Li & Yang, 1987
- Metylophorus cabanae (Williner, 1944)
- Metylophorus calcaratus Mockford, 1991
- Metylophorus camptodontus Li & Yang, 1992
- Metylophorus contaminatus Li & Yang, 1987
- Metylophorus ctenatus New, 1972
- Metylophorus cuneatus (Navas, 1932)
- Metylophorus cyclotus Li, 2002
- Metylophorus daedaleus Li, 2002
- Metylophorus denticulatus (Enderlein, 1910)
- Metylophorus diplodurus Li, 1992
- Metylophorus dongbeicus Li, 2002
- Metylophorus elongatus Endang, Thornton & New, 2002
- Metylophorus fasciatus New, 1980
- Metylophorus fuscatus New, 1978
- Metylophorus giganteus Li, 2002
- Metylophorus hemiphaeopterus (Enderlein, 1900)
- Metylophorus hengshanicus Li, 2002
- Metylophorus hispidus Mockford, 1991
- Metylophorus javensis Endang, Thornton & New, 2002
- Metylophorus jinciensis Li, 2002
- Metylophorus latespinosus Endang, Thornton & New, 2002
- Metylophorus lisae Thornton, 1984
- Metylophorus longicaudatus Li, 2002
- Metylophorus lushanensis Li, 2002
- Metylophorus maculosus Mockford, 1996
- Metylophorus marmoreus Li & Yang, 1988
- Metylophorus medicornutus Li, 2002
- Metylophorus megistus Li, 1997
- Metylophorus mendax Badonnel, 1955
- Metylophorus nebulifer (Navas, 1932)
- Metylophorus nebulosus (Stephens, 1836)
- Metylophorus novaescotiae (Walker, 1853)
- Metylophorus paranebulosus New, 1978
- Metylophorus plebius Li, 1989
- Metylophorus pleiotomus Li, 2002
- Metylophorus purus (Walsh, 1862)
- Metylophorus rotundatus Li, 1992
- Metylophorus symmetricus Mockford, 1991
- Metylophorus theresopolitanus (Enderlein, 1910)
- Metylophorus tricornis Li, 1993
- Metylophorus trivalvis Li, 1992
- Metylophorus uncorneus Li, 2002
- Metylophorus wui Li, 1995
- Metylophorus wuyinicus Li & Yang, 1987
- Metylophorus xizangensis Li & Yang, 1987
- Metylophorus yanezi Badonnel, 1986
