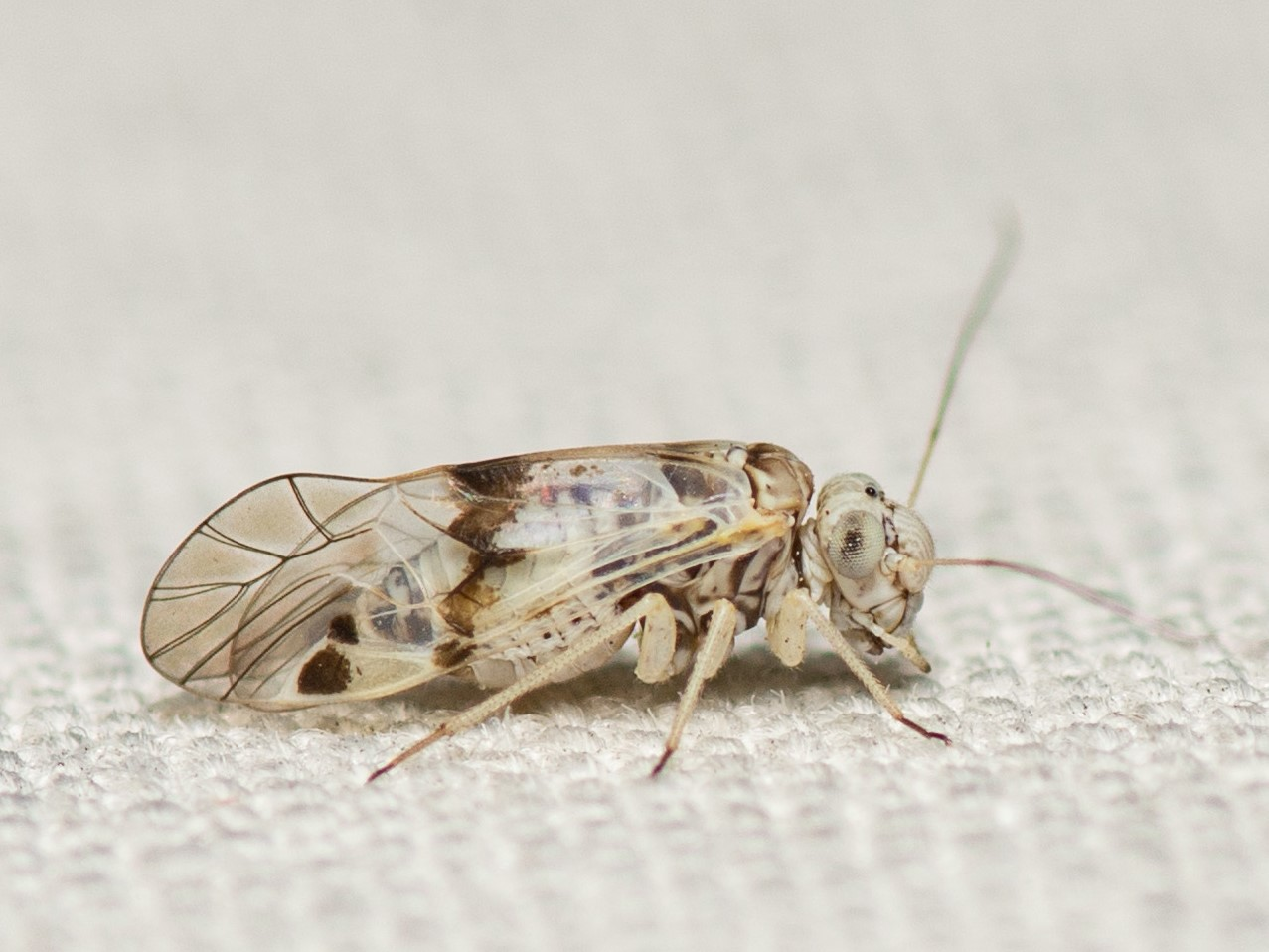
- Indiopsocus lacteus

Scientific classification
- Kingdom: Animalia
- Phylum: Arthropoda
- Clade: Pancrustacea
- Class: Insecta
- Order: Psocodea
- Family: Psocidae
- Subfamily: Psocinae
- Tribe: Ptyctini
- Genus: Indiopsocus; Mockford, 1974

= Indiopsocus =

Genus of booklice

Indiopsocus is a genus of common barklice in the family Psocidae. There are more than 30 described species in the genus Indiopsocus.

== Species ==
These 39 species belong to the genus Indiopsocus:

- Indiopsocus abouchaari (Badonnel, 1986)
- Indiopsocus acraeus (Thornton & Woo, 1973)
- Indiopsocus affinis Mockford, 1974
- Indiopsocus alticola Mockford, 1974
- Indiopsocus bisignatus (Banks, 1904)
- Indiopsocus camagueyensis Mockford, 1974
- Indiopsocus campestris (Aaron, 1886)
- Indiopsocus campestroides Mockford, 2012
- Indiopsocus caraibensis Badonnel, 1989
- Indiopsocus caribe Mockford, 2012
- Indiopsocus ceterus Mockford, 1974
- Indiopsocus coquilletti (Banks, 1920)
- Indiopsocus cristatus (New & Thornton, 1981)
- Indiopsocus cubanus (Banks, 1908)
- Indiopsocus dentatus (Thornton & Woo, 1973)
- Indiopsocus denticulatus Garcia Aldrete, 1999
- Indiopsocus etiennei Badonnel, 1989
- Indiopsocus expansus (New & Thornton, 1975)
- Indiopsocus fallax Mockford, 2012
- Indiopsocus fittkaui (Badonnel, 1986)
- Indiopsocus hilburni Mockford, 1989
- Indiopsocus infumatus (Banks, 1907)
- Indiopsocus jamaicensis Turner, 1975
- Indiopsocus lacteus Mockford & Young, 2015
- Indiopsocus lanceolatus Mockford & Young, 2015
- Indiopsocus mendeli Lienhard, 2011
- Indiopsocus microvariegatus Mockford, 1974
- Indiopsocus nebulosus Mockford, 1989
- Indiopsocus obrieni Badonnel, 1989
- Indiopsocus palisadensis Turner, 1975
- Indiopsocus pallidus Mockford, 1974
- Indiopsocus palmatus Mockford & Young, 2015
- Indiopsocus paranensis (New & Thornton, 1975)
- Indiopsocus pulcher Turner, 1975
- Indiopsocus rosalesi Mockford, 1996
- Indiopsocus sinuatistigma (New, 1972)
- Indiopsocus texanus (Aaron, 1886)
- Indiopsocus ubiquitus Mockford, 1974
- Indiopsocus variegatus Mockford, 1974
