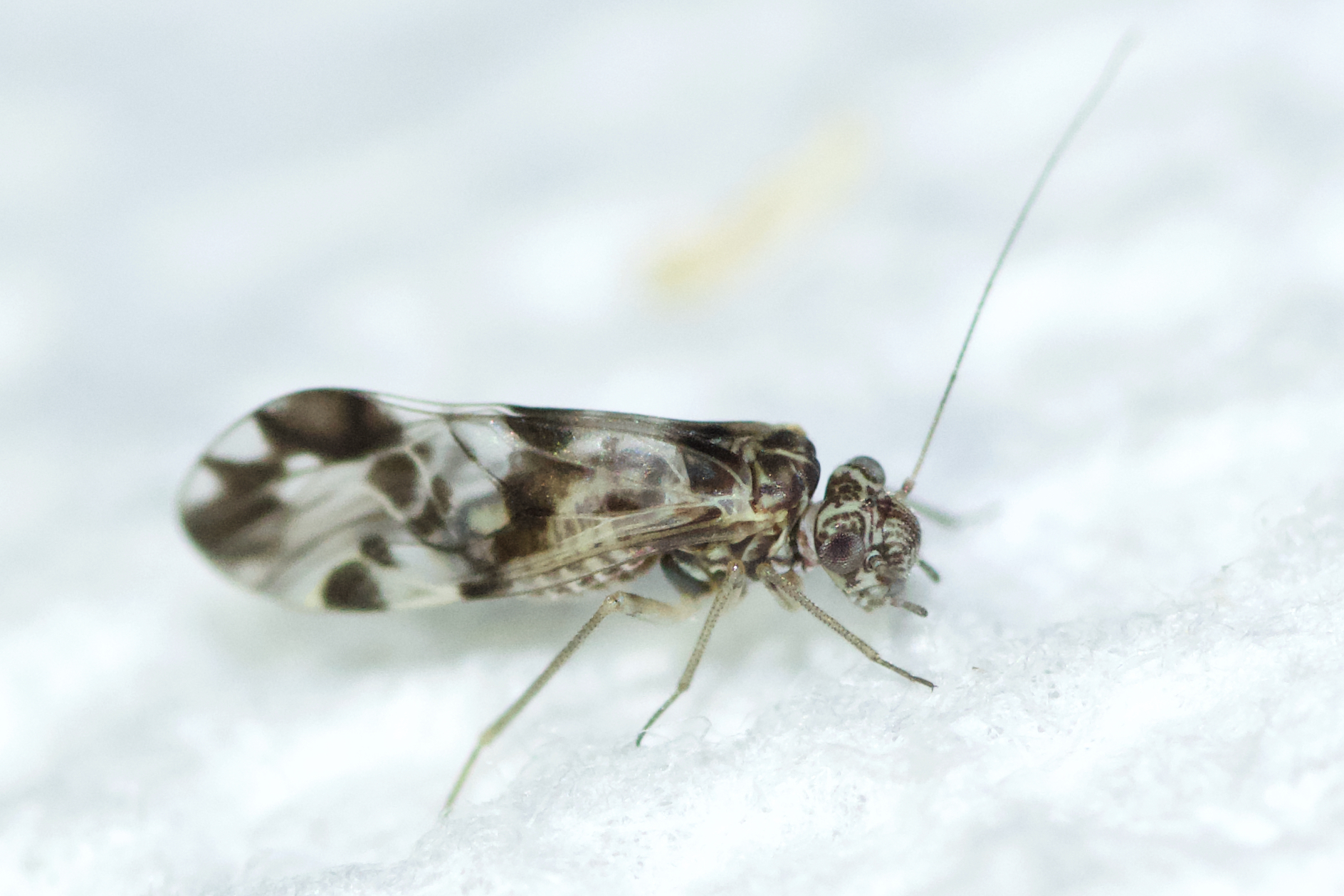
- Ptycta polluta, Canada

Scientific classification
- Domain: Eukaryota
- Kingdom: Animalia
- Phylum: Arthropoda
- Class: Insecta
- Order: Psocodea
- Family: Psocidae
- Tribe: Ptyctini
- Genus: Ptycta
- Species: P. polluta

Binomial name
- Ptycta polluta (Walsh, 1862)

= Ptycta polluta =

Species of booklouse

Ptycta polluta is a species of common barklouse in the family Psocidae. It is found in Central America and North America.
