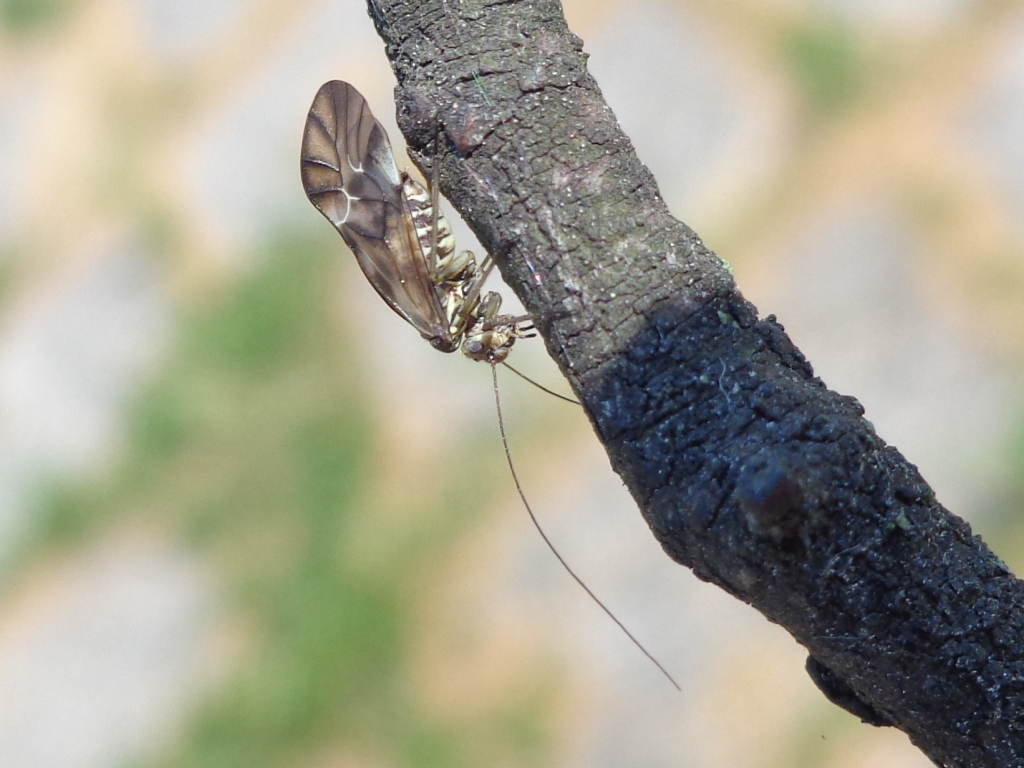

Scientific classification
- Kingdom: Animalia
- Phylum: Arthropoda
- Clade: Pancrustacea
- Class: Insecta
- Order: Psocodea
- Family: Psocidae
- Genus: Metylophorus
- Species: M. nebulosus

Binomial name
- Metylophorus nebulosus (Stephens, 1836)

= Metylophorus nebulosus =

Species of booklouse

Metylophorus nebulosus is a species of Psocoptera from the Psocidae family that can be found in Great Britain and Ireland. They can also be found in Albania, Austria, Belgium, Bulgaria, Croatia, Denmark, Finland, France, Germany, Greece, Hungary, Italy, Latvia, Luxembourg, Norway, Poland, Portugal, Romania, Spain, Sweden, Switzerland, and the Netherlands. The species are either black or brown coloured.

== Habitat ==
The species feed on beech, birch, bird cherry, blackthorn, broom, elder, elm, field maple, holm oak, pine, sallow, sea buckthorn, spruce, and yew. It also likes to feed on apples.
