= Camelopsocus =

Scientific classification
- Domain: Eukaryota
- Kingdom: Animalia
- Phylum: Arthropoda
- Class: Insecta
- Order: Psocodea
- Family: Psocidae
- Subfamily: Psocinae
- Tribe: Ptyctini
- Genus: Camelopsocus; Mockford, 1965

Genus of booklice

Camelopsocus is a genus of common barklice in the family Psocidae. There are about five described species in Camelopsocus.

== Species ==
These five species belong to the genus Camelopsocus:

- Camelopsocus bactrianus Mockford, 1984
- Camelopsocus hiemalis Mockford, 1984
- Camelopsocus monticolus Mockford, 1965
- Camelopsocus similis Mockford, 1965
- Camelopsocus tucsonensis Mockford, 1984
