= Steleops =

Scientific classification
- Domain: Eukaryota
- Kingdom: Animalia
- Phylum: Arthropoda
- Class: Insecta
- Order: Psocodea
- Family: Psocidae
- Subfamily: Psocinae
- Tribe: Ptyctini
- Genus: Steleops; Enderlein, 1910

Genus of booklice

Steleops is a genus of common barklice in the family Psocidae. There are more than 20 described species in Steleops.

== Species ==
These 24 species belong to the genus Steleops:

- Steleops albertonetoi Gonzalez Obando, Garcia Aldrete & Carrejo, 2011
- Steleops barrerai Garcia Aldrete, 1995
- Steleops buitrerensis Gonzalez Obando, Garcia Aldrete & Carrejo, 2011
- Steleops cashiriariensis Gonzalez Obando, Garcia Aldrete & Carrejo, 2011
- Steleops chamelaensis Gonzalez Obando, Garcia Aldrete & Carrejo, 2011
- Steleops conipata Garcia Aldrete & Menchaca Lopez, 1982
- Steleops cuzcoensis Gonzalez Obando, Garcia Aldrete & Carrejo, 2011
- Steleops elegans (Banks, 1904)
- Steleops lichenatus (Walsh, 1863)
- Steleops machupicchuensis Gonzalez Obando, Garcia Aldrete & Carrejo, 2011
- Steleops maculatus New, 1972
- Steleops manizalensis Gonzalez Obando, Garcia Aldrete & Carrejo, 2011
- Steleops mendivili Gonzalez Obando, Garcia Aldrete & Carrejo, 2011
- Steleops monticola Garcia Aldrete, 1981
- Steleops ortegae Garcia Aldrete, 1995
- Steleops pedunculatus (Enderlein, 1910)
- Steleops plenitudensis Gonzalez Obando, Garcia Aldrete & Carrejo, 2011
- Steleops pulcher New, 1972
- Steleops punctipennis Enderlein, 1910
- Steleops purus Mockford, 1996
- Steleops rioblancoensis Gonzalez Obando, Garcia Aldrete & Carrejo, 2011
- Steleops tambopata Garcia Aldrete, 1995
- Steleops thorntoni Gonzalez Obando, Garcia Aldrete & Carrejo, 2011
- Steleops wygodzinskyi Mockford, 1996
