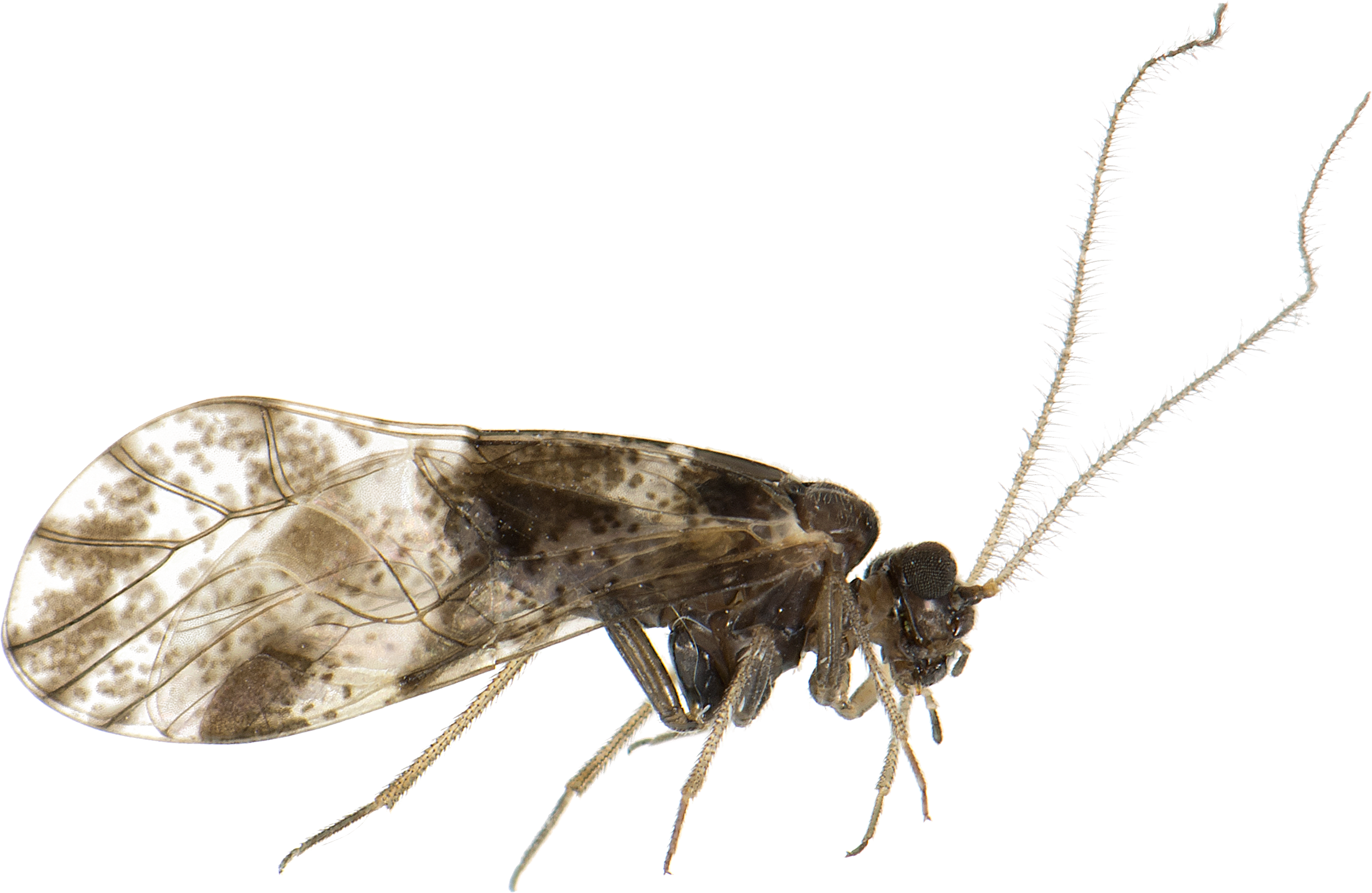

Scientific classification
- Kingdom: Animalia
- Phylum: Arthropoda
- Clade: Pancrustacea
- Class: Insecta
- Order: Psocodea
- Family: Psocidae
- Genus: Loensia
- Species: L. fasciata

Binomial name
- Loensia fasciata (Fabricius, 1787)

= Loensia fasciata =

Species of booklouse

Loensia fasciata is a species of Psocoptera from the Psocidae family that can be found in Great Britain and Ireland. The species are yellowish-black.

== Habitat ==
The species feed on alder, ash, aspen, beech, cedar, hawthorn, hazel, oak, pine, sycamore, and yew. It also likes apples.
