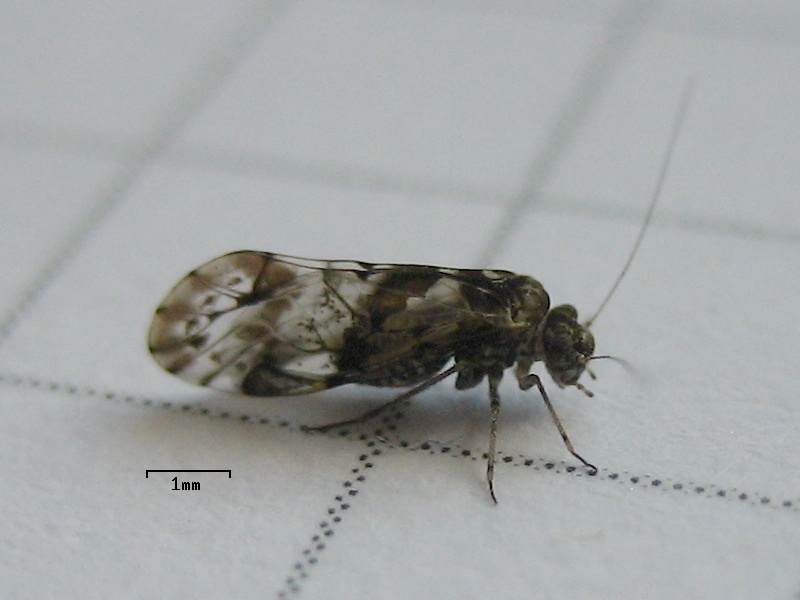

Scientific classification
- Kingdom: Animalia
- Phylum: Arthropoda
- Class: Insecta
- Order: Psocodea
- Family: Psocidae
- Genus: Trichadenotecnum
- Species: T. sexpunctatum

Binomial name
- Trichadenotecnum sexpunctatum (Linnaeus, 1758)

= Trichadenotecnum sexpunctatum =

Species of booklouse

Trichadenotecnum sexpunctatum is a species of Psocoptera from the Psocidae family that can be found in Great Britain and Ireland. The species are brownish-black coloured, but can also be yellowish-black, and striped. It can easily be mistaken for a wasp.

== Habitat ==
The species feed on alder, ash, beech, blackthorn, hazel, oak, pine, privet, spruce, sallow, and yew.
