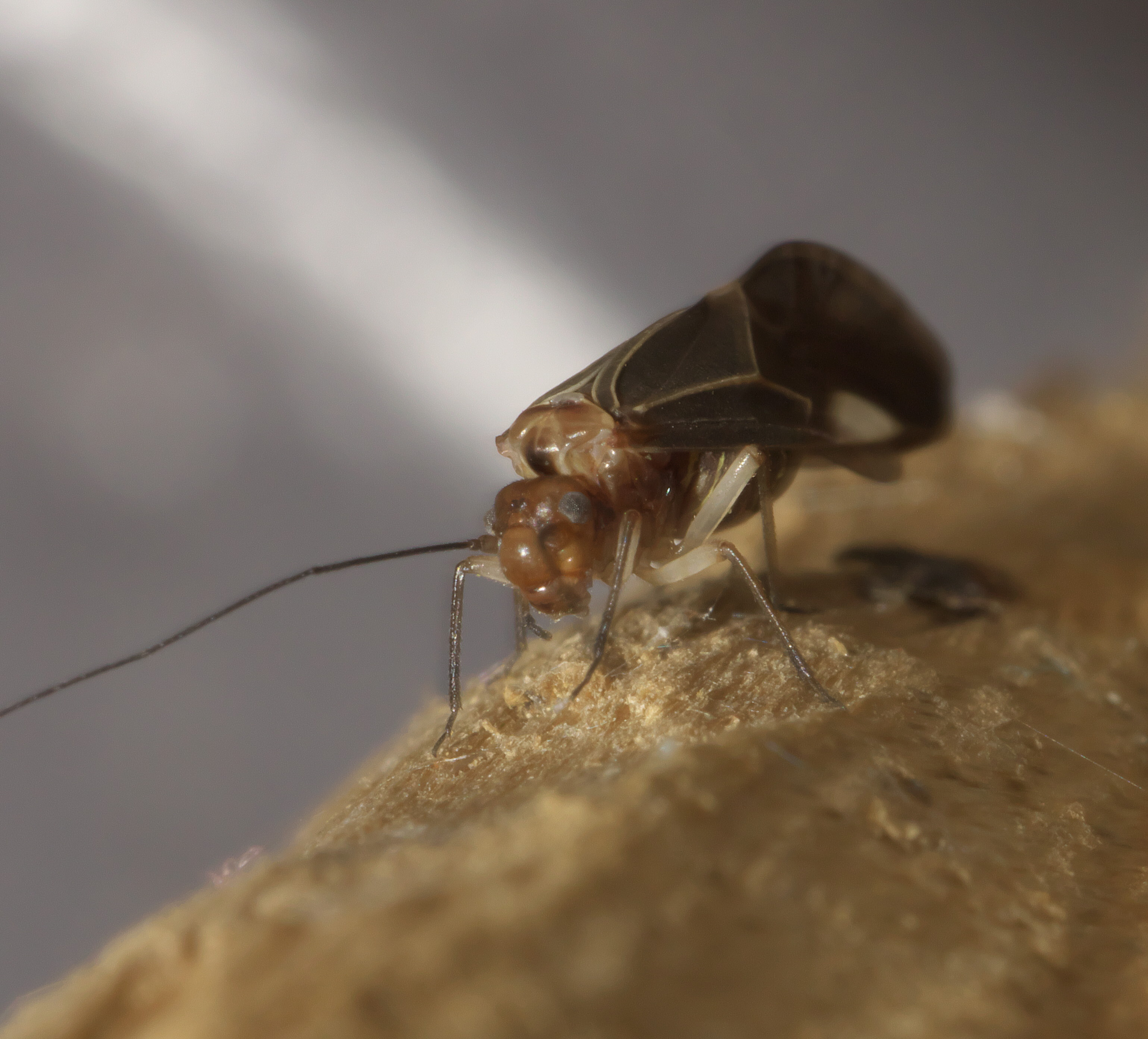
- Cerastipsocus venosus

Scientific classification
- Domain: Eukaryota
- Kingdom: Animalia
- Phylum: Arthropoda
- Class: Insecta
- Order: Psocodea
- Family: Psocidae
- Subfamily: Psocinae

= Psocinae =

Subfamily of booklice

Psocinae is a subfamily of common barklice in the family Psocidae. There are about 11 genera and at least 40 described species in Psocinae.

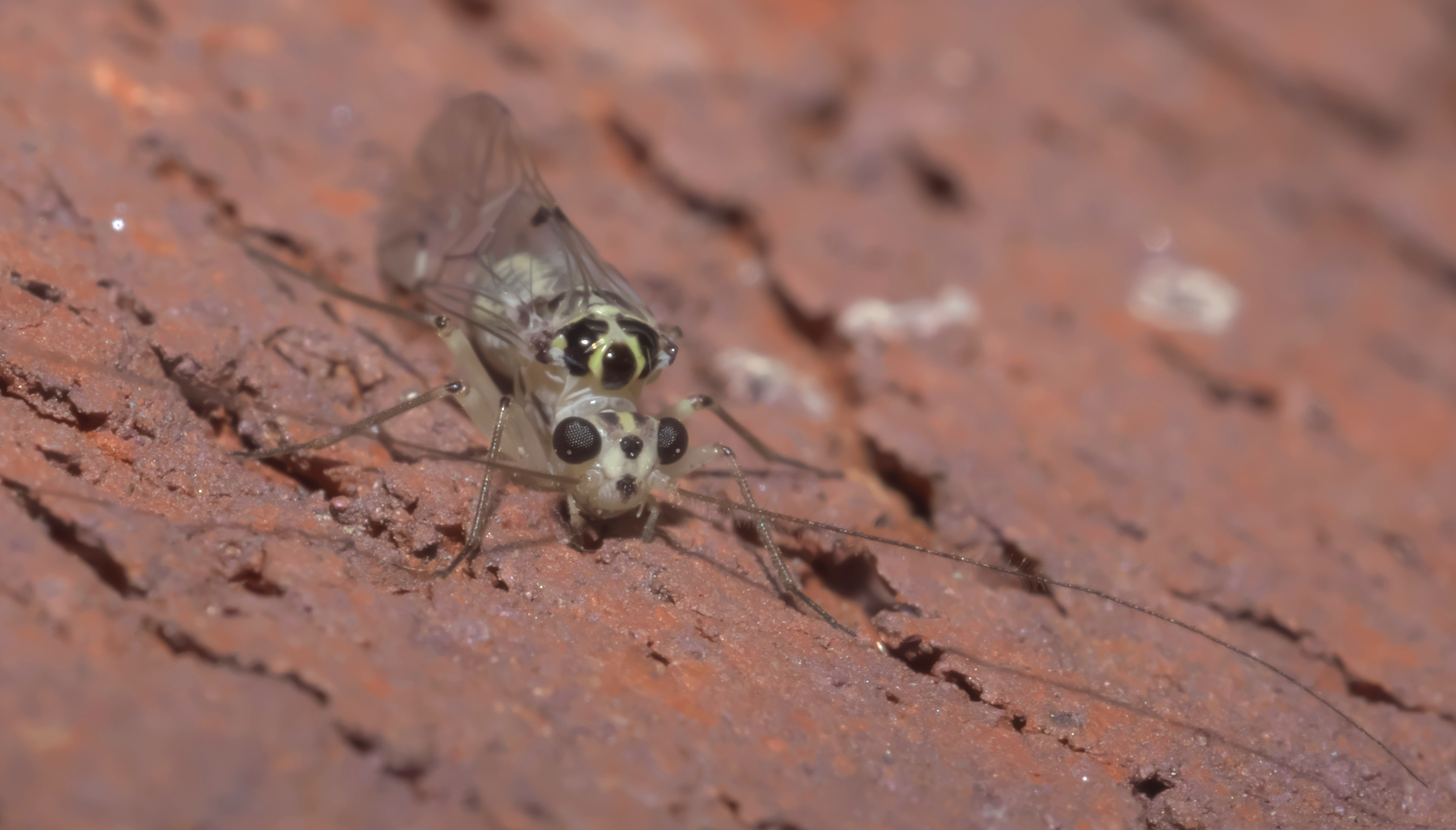
Metylophorus purus

== Genera ==
These 11 genera belong to the subfamily Psocinae:

- Atropsocus Mockford, 1993^{i c g b}
- Camelopsocus Mockford, 1965^{i c g b}
- Cerastipsocus Kolbe, 1884^{i c g b}
- Hyalopsocus Roesler, 1954^{i c g b}
- Indiopsocus Mockford, 1974^{i c g b}
- Loensia Enderlein, 1924^{i c g b}
- Metylophorus Pearman, 1932^{i c g b}
- Psocus Latreille, 1794^{i c g b}
- Ptycta Enderlein, 1925^{i c g b}
- Steleops Enderlein, 1910^{i c g b}
- Trichadenotecnum Enderlein, 1909^{i c g b}

Data sources: i = ITIS, c = Catalogue of Life, g = GBIF, b = Bugguide.net
