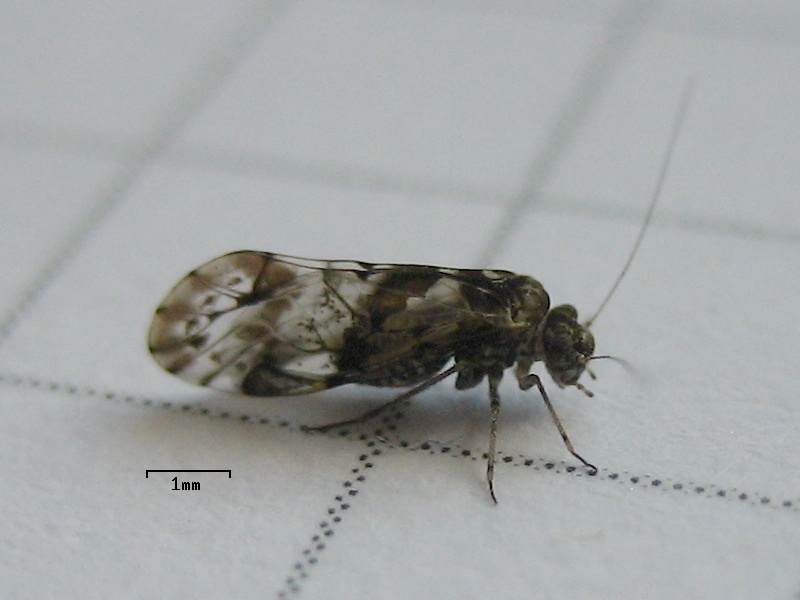
- Trichadenotecnum sexpunctatum

Scientific classification
- Kingdom: Animalia
- Phylum: Arthropoda
- Clade: Pancrustacea
- Class: Insecta
- Order: Psocodea
- Family: Psocidae
- Subfamily: Psocinae
- Tribe: Ptyctini
- Genus: Trichadenotecnum; Enderlein, 1909

Diversity
- at least 210 species

= Trichadenotecnum =

Genus of booklice

Trichadenotecnum is a genus of insects in the order Psocoptera, the booklice, barklice, and bookflies. It is one of the largest genera, including over 200 described species.

The biology of the genus is similar to that of many other booklice. T. alexanderae, for example, feeds on pleurococcine algae and the female reproduces by mating with a male. In some closely related species, the females instead undergo thelytoky, producing eggs without fertilization.

Trichadenotecnum is well separated from related genera, forming a monophyletic group. The large genus is divided into several clades, some of which are further divided into subclades. These groups are mainly separated on the basis of the morphology of the genitalia, which is quite variable in this genus. The male genitalia are the most important structures used to distinguish species. Some males have distinctly asymmetrical genitalia.

In general, these insects have forewings that are about 2 or 3 millimeters long and have variable spotted patterns.

Trichadenotecnum occur throughout most of the world, except for Australia and New Zealand, which have no native species.

== See also ==
- List of Trichadenotecnum species
