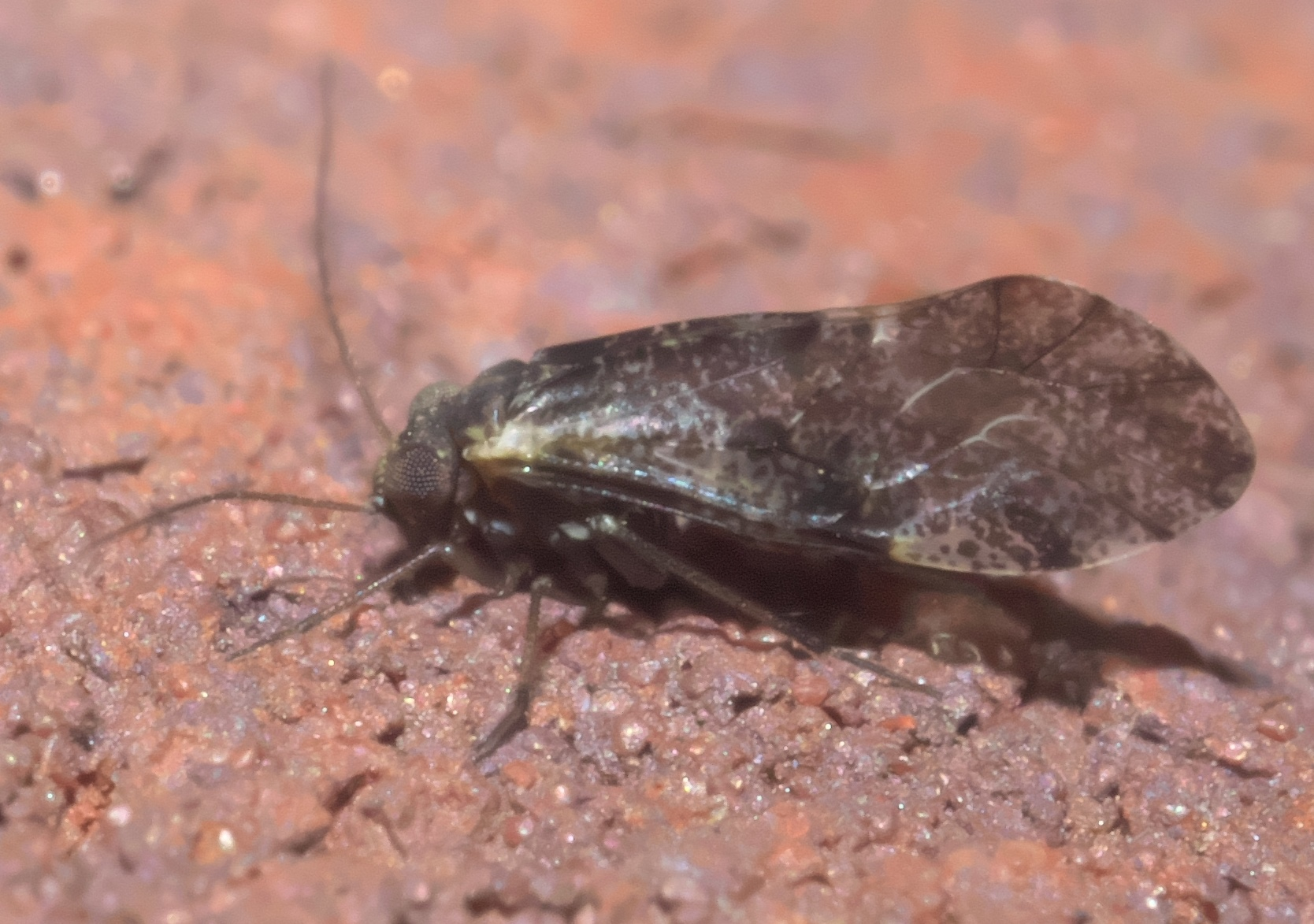
- Loensia moesta

Scientific classification
- Domain: Eukaryota
- Kingdom: Animalia
- Phylum: Arthropoda
- Class: Insecta
- Order: Psocodea
- Family: Psocidae
- Subfamily: Psocinae
- Tribe: Ptyctini

= Ptyctini =

Tribe of barklice

Ptyctini is a tribe of common barklice in the family Psocidae. There are about 6 genera and at least 20 described species in Ptyctini.

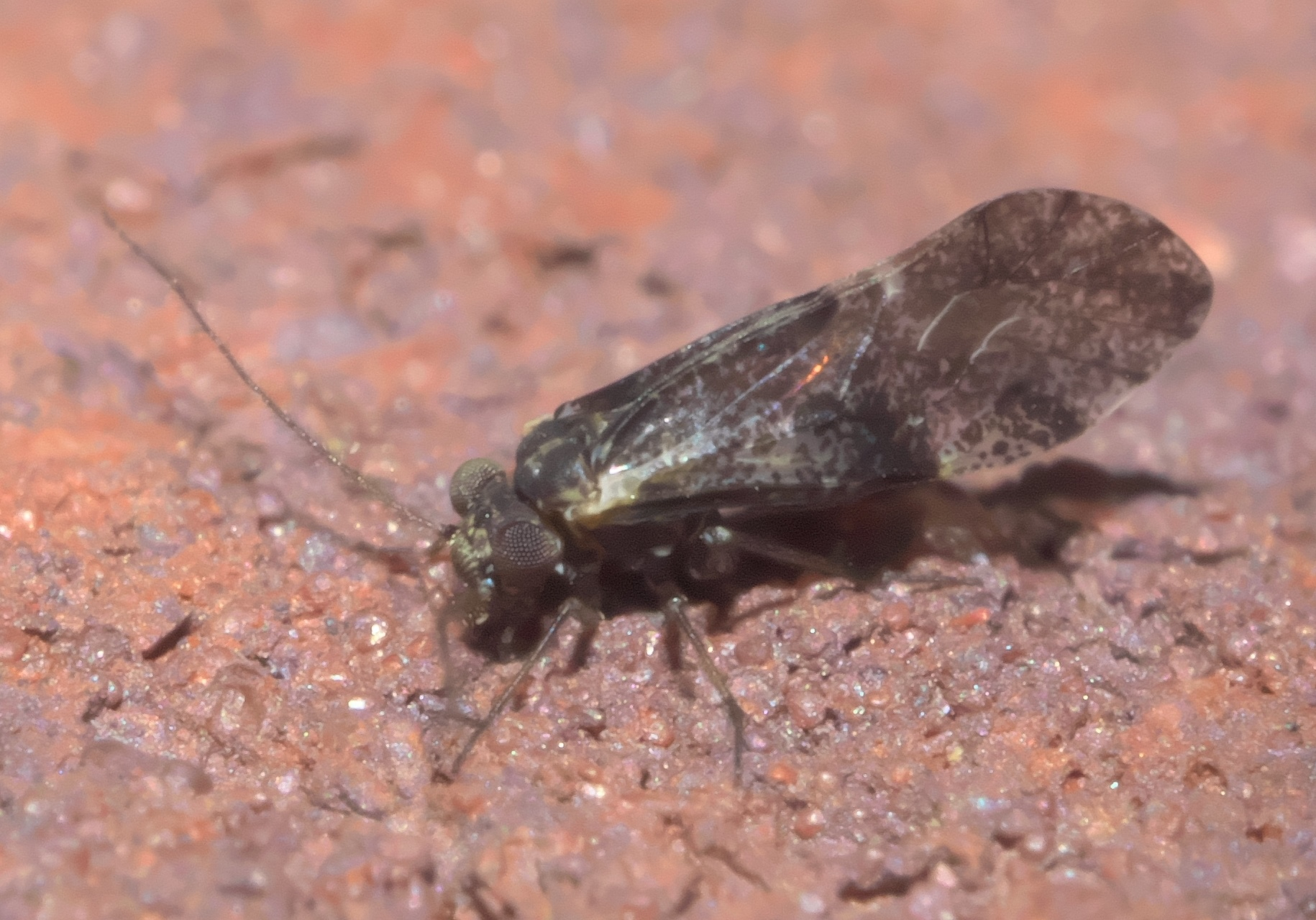
Loensia moesta

== Genera ==
These six genera belong to the tribe Ptyctini:

- Camelopsocus Mockford, 1965^{i c g b}
- Indiopsocus Mockford, 1974^{i c g b}
- Loensia Enderlein, 1924^{i c g b}
- Ptycta Enderlein, 1925^{i c g b}
- Steleops Enderlein, 1910^{i c g b}
- Trichadenotecnum Enderlein, 1909^{i c g b}

Data sources: i = ITIS, c = Catalogue of Life, g = GBIF, b = Bugguide.net
