= List of Blaste species =

This is a list of 111 species in Blaste, a genus of common barklice in the family Psocidae.

== Blaste species ==
- Blaste alfineta New, 1972^{c g}
- Blaste alluaudi (Badonnel, 1935)^{c g}
- Blaste amazonica Garcia Aldrete, 1999^{c g}
- Blaste angolensis Badonnel, 1955^{c g}
- Blaste angusta Smithers, Courtenay, 1984^{c g}
- Blaste angustipennis Mockford, 1996^{c g}
- Blaste annellus (Banks, N., 1941)^{c g}
- Blaste aptera Broadhead & Alison Richards, 1980^{c g}
- Blaste arabica New, 1979^{c g}
- Blaste auricularia Badonnel, 1987^{c g}
- Blaste bahamensis Mockford, 2012^{c g}
- Blaste balli (Badonnel, 1945)^{c g}
- Blaste basilewskyi Badonnel, 1976^{c g}
- Blaste betschi Badonnel, 1976^{c g}
- Blaste bicuspis Smithers, Courtenay, 1964^{c g}
- Blaste binotata (Enderlein, 1926)^{c g}
- Blaste bistriata Schmidt, E. R. & Thornton, 1993^{c g}
- Blaste bridarollii (Navas, 1928)^{c g}
- Blaste capricornuta Mockford, 1974^{c g}
- Blaste castala Thornton & Lyall, 1978^{c g}
- Blaste caudata Mockford, 1991^{c g}
- Blaste cinerea (Enderlein, 1903)^{c g}
- Blaste cockerelli (Banks, 1904)^{i c g}
- Blaste conspurcata (Rambur, 1842)^{c g}
- Blaste cornuta Badonnel, 1987^{c g}
- Blaste cyclota Li, Fasheng, 2002^{c g}
- Blaste cyprica Lienhard, 1995^{c g}
- Blaste didyma Lienhard, 1986^{c g}
- Blaste dundoensis Badonnel, 1955^{c g}
- Blaste edwardi Lienhard & Courtenay Smithers, 2002^{c g}
- Blaste euryphylla Li, Fasheng & Chikun Yang, 1987^{c g}
- Blaste falcifer (Smithers, Courtenay, 1979)^{c g}
- Blaste falsa Badonnel, 1976^{c g}
- Blaste fasciata Mockford, 1974^{c g}
- Blaste forcepata (New, 1972)^{c g}
- Blaste forficula Schmidt, E. R. & Thornton, 1993^{c g}
- Blaste furcilla (New, 1974)^{c g}
- Blaste fuscoptera New, 1975^{c g}
- Blaste fusimera New & Thornton, 1975^{c g}
- Blaste garciorum Mockford, 1984^{i c g b}
- Blaste hamata Mockford, 1991^{c g}
- Blaste harpophylla Li, Fasheng, 2002^{c g}
- Blaste immobilis Mockford, 1974^{c g}
- Blaste jambiense Endang & New, 2010^{c g}
- Blaste lignicola (Enderlein, 1906)^{c g}
- Blaste ligula New & Thornton, 1975^{c g}
- Blaste longicauda Mockford, 1974^{c g}
- Blaste longipennis (Banks, 1918)^{i c g b}
- Blaste longispina Mockford, 1991^{c g}
- Blaste longivalva New, 1975^{c g}
- Blaste lunulata (New, 1974)^{c}
- Blaste lusambaensis Badonnel, 1973^{c g}
- Blaste lyriphallus New, 1973^{c g}
- Blaste machadoi Badonnel, 1955^{c g}
- Blaste macrops (Smithers, Courtenay, 1984)^{c g}
- Blaste macrura New, 1972^{c g}
- Blaste magnifica Smithers, Courtenay, 1984^{c g}
- Blaste martini (Navas, 1922)^{c g}
- Blaste medleri New, 1975^{c g}
- Blaste membranosa Lienhard & Halperin, 1988^{c g}
- Blaste memorialis (Banks, N., 1920)^{c g}
- Blaste monserrati Baz, 1990^{c g}
- Blaste muhni (Navas, 1928)^{c g}
- Blaste nairobensis New, 1975^{c g}
- Blaste nana New, 1975^{c g}
- Blaste neotenica Mockford, 1996^{c g}
- Blaste nubeculosa (Navás, 1932)^{c g}
- Blaste nubilistigma Mockford, 1996^{c g}
- Blaste obscura (New, 1972)^{c g}
- Blaste obtusa (Hagen, 1858)^{c g}
- Blaste octofaria Li, Fasheng, 2002^{c g}
- Blaste opposita (Banks, 1907)^{i c g b}
- Blaste oregona (Banks, 1900)^{i c g b}
- Blaste osceola Mockford, 1984^{i c g b}
- Blaste osella Lienhard, 1987^{c g}
- Blaste pallida Mockford, 1996^{c g}
- Blaste panops (Smithers, Courtenay, 1979)^{c g}
- Blaste pauliani (Badonnel, 1943)^{c g}
- Blaste peringueyi (Enderlein, 1925)^{c g}
- Blaste persimilis (Banks, 1908)^{i c g b}
- Blaste phrynae Li, Fasheng, 2002^{c g}
- Blaste plaumanni New, 1978^{c g}
- Blaste polioptera Smithers, Courtenay, 1964^{c g}
- Blaste posticata (Banks, 1905)^{i c g b}
- Blaste pseudozonata (Williner, 1945)^{c g}
- Blaste pusilla Mockford, 1984^{c g}
- Blaste quadrimaculata (Latreille, 1794)^{c g}
- Blaste quieta (Hagen, 1861)^{i c g b}
- Blaste richardsi New, 1972^{c g}
- Blaste rotundata (Navas, 1918)^{c g}
- Blaste sarda Lienhard, 1986^{c g}
- Blaste serrata New, 1973^{c g}
- Blaste similis Broadhead & Alison Richards, 1980^{c g}
- Blaste simillima (Enderlein, 1925)^{c g}
- Blaste smilivirgata Li, Fasheng, 1989^{c g}
- Blaste squarrosa New & Thornton, 1975^{c g}
- Blaste stuckenbergi Smithers, Courtenay, 1964^{c g}
- Blaste subapterous (Chapman, 1930)^{i c g}
- Blaste subquieta (Chapman, 1930)^{i c g b}
- Blaste suffusa Broadhead & Alison Richards, 1980^{c g}
- Blaste taylori New, 1974^{c g}
- Blaste tillyardi (Smithers, Courtenay, 1969)^{c g}
- Blaste togoensis Turner, B. D. & Cheke, 1983^{c g}
- Blaste triangularum Badonnel, 1955^{c g}
- Blaste ukingana (Enderlein, 1902)^{c g}
- Blaste vadoni Badonnel, 1967^{c g}
- Blaste verticalis Li, Fasheng, 2002^{c g}
- Blaste viettei Badonnel, 1969^{c g}
- Blaste vilhenai Badonnel, 1955^{c g}
- Blaste virgata Broadhead & Alison Richards, 1980^{c g}
- Blaste yigongensis Li, Fasheng & Chikun Yang, 1987^{c g}

Data sources: i = ITIS, c = Catalogue of Life, g = GBIF, b = Bugguide.net
