= Blaste opposita =

Scientific classification
- Domain: Eukaryota
- Kingdom: Animalia
- Phylum: Arthropoda
- Class: Insecta
- Order: Psocodea
- Family: Psocidae
- Genus: Blaste
- Species: B. opposita

Binomial name
- Blaste opposita (Banks, 1907)

Species of booklouse

Blaste opposita is a species of common barklouse in the family Psocidae. It is found in North America.
