= Blastopsocus lithinus =

Scientific classification
- Domain: Eukaryota
- Kingdom: Animalia
- Phylum: Arthropoda
- Class: Insecta
- Order: Psocodea
- Family: Psocidae
- Genus: Blastopsocus
- Species: B. lithinus

Binomial name
- Blastopsocus lithinus (Chapman, 1930)

Species of booklouse

Blastopsocus lithinus is a species of common barklouse in the family Psocidae. It is found in Central America and North America.
