= Psocus leidyi =

Scientific classification
- Domain: Eukaryota
- Kingdom: Animalia
- Phylum: Arthropoda
- Class: Insecta
- Order: Psocodea
- Family: Psocidae
- Tribe: Psocini
- Genus: Psocus
- Species: P. leidyi

Binomial name
- Psocus leidyi Aaron, 1886

Species of booklouse

Psocus leidyi is a species of common barklouse in the family Psocidae. It is found in Central America and North America.
