= Amphigerontia intermedia =

Scientific classification
- Domain: Eukaryota
- Kingdom: Animalia
- Phylum: Arthropoda
- Class: Insecta
- Order: Psocodea
- Family: Psocidae
- Genus: Amphigerontia
- Species: A. intermedia

Binomial name
- Amphigerontia intermedia (Tetens, 1891)

Species of booklouse

Amphigerontia intermedia is a species of psocopteran from the Psocidae family. It is widely distributed in Europe except in the east (Finland, France, Germany, Hungary, Italy, Poland, Romania, Sweden, Switzerland, and the Netherlands).
