= Thyrsopsocus elegans =

Scientific classification
- Kingdom: Animalia
- Phylum: Arthropoda
- Clade: Pancrustacea
- Class: Insecta
- Order: Psocodea
- Family: Psocidae
- Genus: Thyrsopsocus
- Species: T. elegans

Binomial name
- Thyrsopsocus elegans (Enderlein, 1925)

Synonyms
- Colpostigma elegans Enderlein, 1925

Species of booklouse

Thyrsopsocus elegans is a species of Psocoptera in the family Psocidae. It is found in Brazil.
