= Lichenomima lugens =

Scientific classification
- Domain: Eukaryota
- Kingdom: Animalia
- Phylum: Arthropoda
- Class: Insecta
- Order: Psocodea
- Family: Myopsocidae
- Genus: Lichenomima
- Species: L. lugens

Binomial name
- Lichenomima lugens (Hagen, 1861)

Species of booklouse

Lichenomima lugens is a species of mouse-like barklouse in the family Myopsocidae. It is found in North America.
