= Blaste osceola =

Scientific classification
- Domain: Eukaryota
- Kingdom: Animalia
- Phylum: Arthropoda
- Class: Insecta
- Order: Psocodea
- Family: Psocidae
- Genus: Blaste
- Species: B. osceola

Binomial name
- Blaste osceola Mockford, 1984

Species of booklouse

Blaste osceola is a species of common barklouse in the family Psocidae. It is found in North America.
