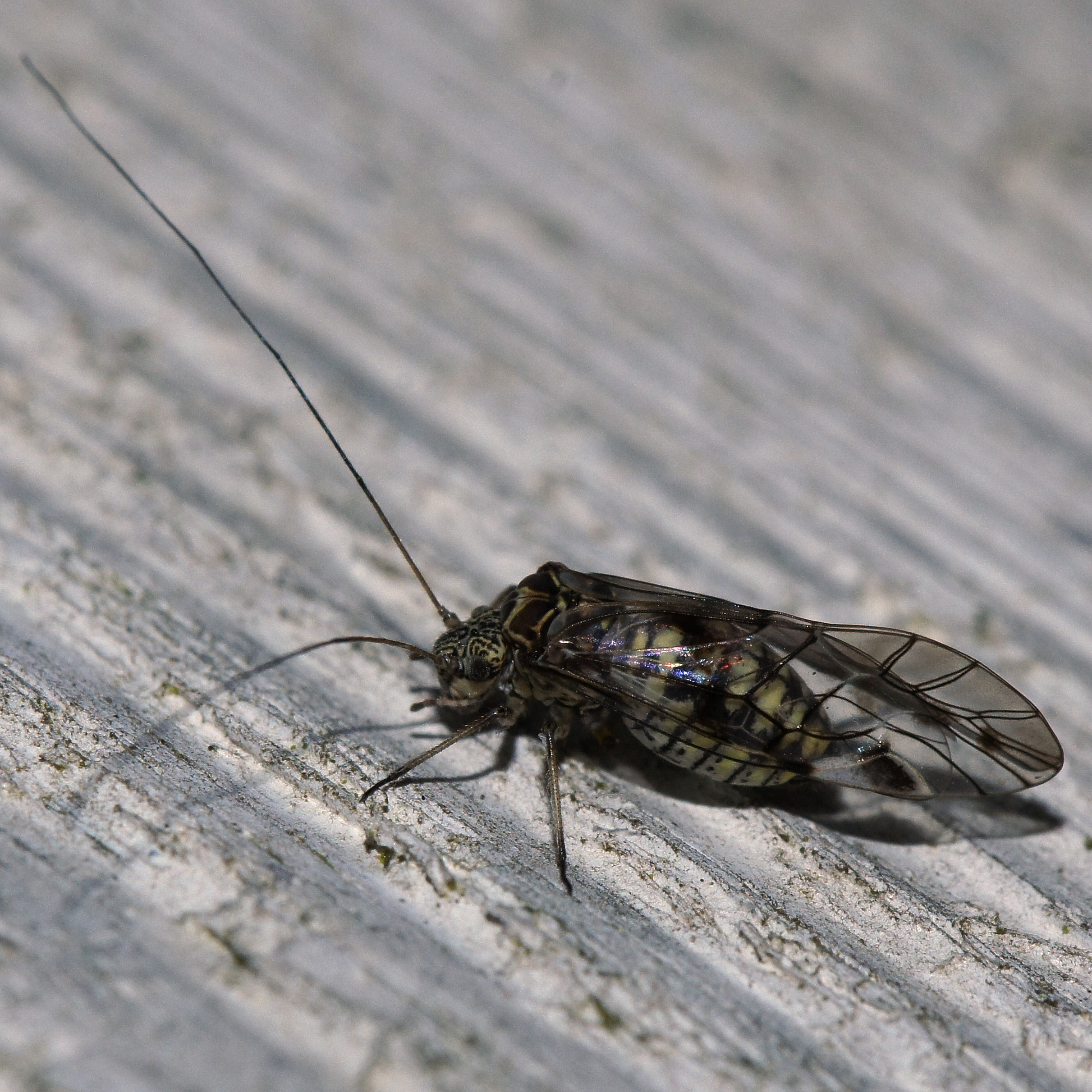

Scientific classification
- Domain: Eukaryota
- Kingdom: Animalia
- Phylum: Arthropoda
- Class: Insecta
- Order: Psocodea
- Family: Psocidae
- Genus: Psococerastis
- Species: P. gibbosa

Binomial name
- Psococerastis gibbosa (Sulzer, 1776)

= Psococerastis gibbosa =

Species of booklouse

Psococerastis gibbosa is a species of Psocoptera from the Psocidae family that can be found in Great Britain and Ireland. They are also common in Austria, Benelux, Bulgaria, Croatia, Finland, France, Germany, Hungary, Italy, Latvia, Poland, Romania, Spain, Switzerland, and Scandinavia. The species are yellowish-black coloured, and are striped.

== Habitat ==
The species feeds on ash, beech, birch, blackthorn, elder, hawthorn, hazel, larch, oak, pine, and sallow. They sometimes eat apples.
