= Blaste longipennis =

Scientific classification
- Domain: Eukaryota
- Kingdom: Animalia
- Phylum: Arthropoda
- Class: Insecta
- Order: Psocodea
- Family: Psocidae
- Genus: Blaste
- Species: B. longipennis

Binomial name
- Blaste longipennis (Banks, 1918)

Species of barklouse

Blaste longipennis is a species of common barklouse in the family Psocidae. It is found in North America.
