= Amphigerontia bifasciata =

Scientific classification
- Kingdom: Animalia
- Phylum: Arthropoda
- Class: Insecta
- Order: Psocodea
- Family: Psocidae
- Genus: Amphigerontia
- Species: A. bifasciata

Binomial name
- Amphigerontia bifasciata (Latreille, 1799)

Species of booklouse

Amphigerontia bifasciata is a yellowish-black coloured species of Psocoptera from Psocidae family that can be found in Great Britain and Ireland. They can also be found in Austria, Belgium, Croatia, Denmark, Finland, France, Germany, Hungary, Italy, Latvia, Luxembourg, Norway, Poland, Romania, Sweden, Switzerland, and the Netherlands.

== Habitat ==
The species feeds on introduced conifers and plants such as:

- Beech
- Birch
- Bird cherry
- Broom
- Gorse
- Hawthorn
- Larch
- Marram grass
- Oak
- Pine
- Rowan
- Sallow
- Willow
- Yew
