= Blaste subquieta =

Scientific classification
- Domain: Eukaryota
- Kingdom: Animalia
- Phylum: Arthropoda
- Class: Insecta
- Order: Psocodea
- Family: Psocidae
- Genus: Blaste
- Species: B. subquieta

Binomial name
- Blaste subquieta (Chapman, 1930)

Synonyms
- Psocus subquietus Chapman, 1930

Species of booklouse

Blaste subquieta is a species of common barklouse in the family Psocidae. It is found in North America.
