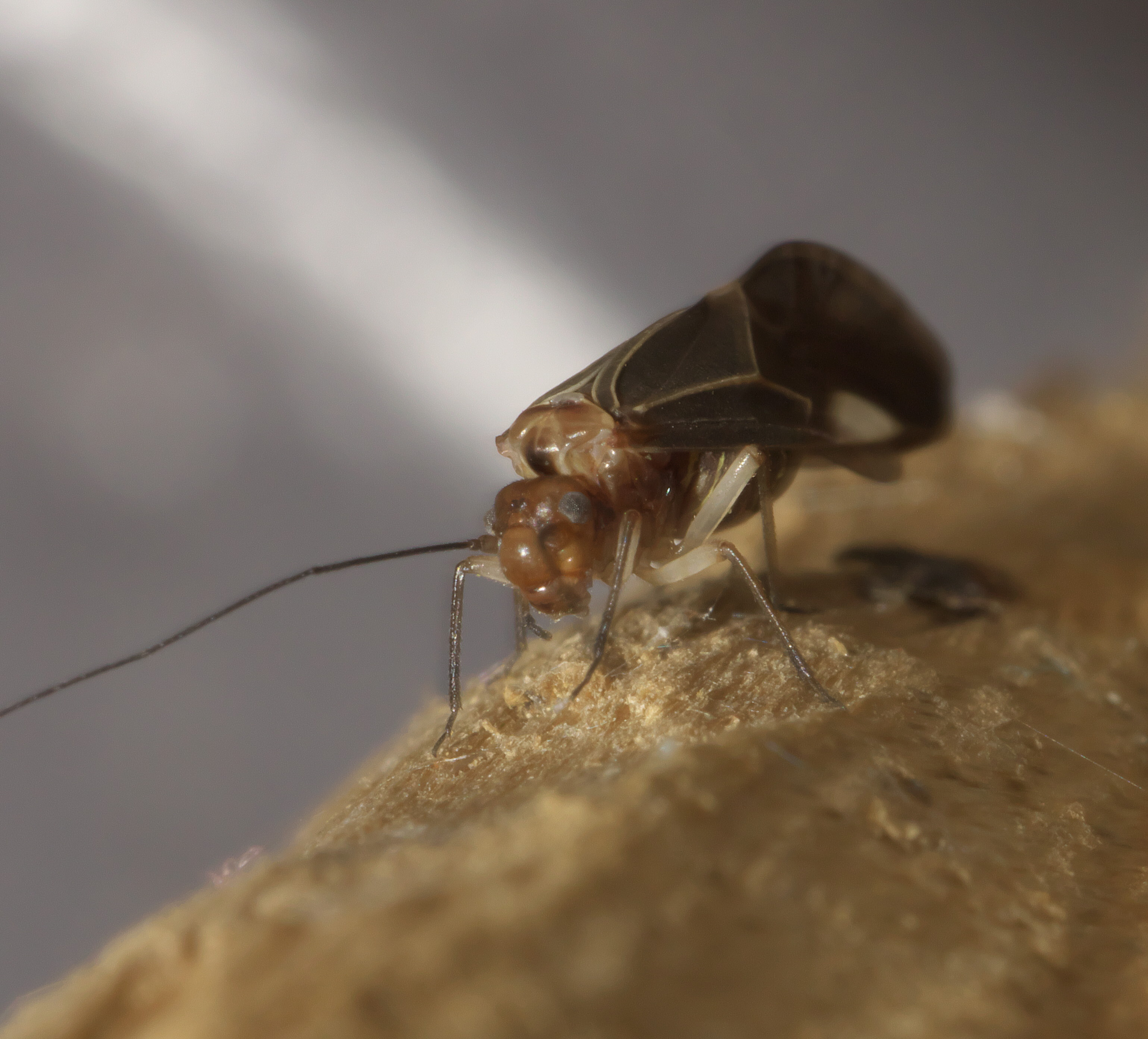

Scientific classification
- Domain: Eukaryota
- Kingdom: Animalia
- Phylum: Arthropoda
- Class: Insecta
- Order: Psocodea
- Family: Psocidae
- Genus: Cerastipsocus
- Species: C. venosus

Binomial name
- Cerastipsocus venosus (Burmeister, 1839)

= Cerastipsocus venosus =

Species of booklouse

Cerastipsocus venosus is a species of common barklouse in the family Psocidae. It is found in the Caribbean Sea, Central America, and North America. Nymphs often move in a tightly packed herd. They feed on lichen.

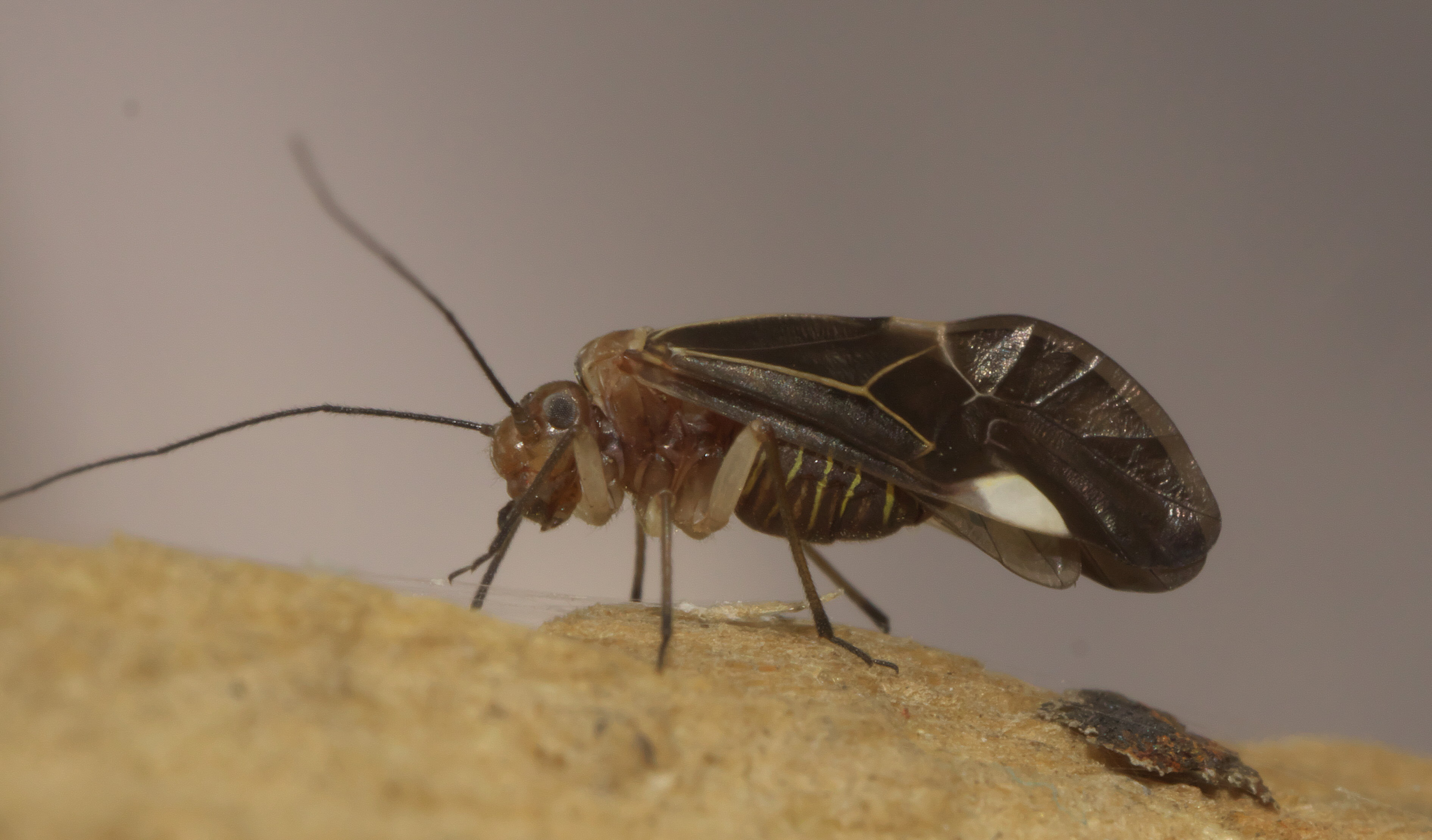

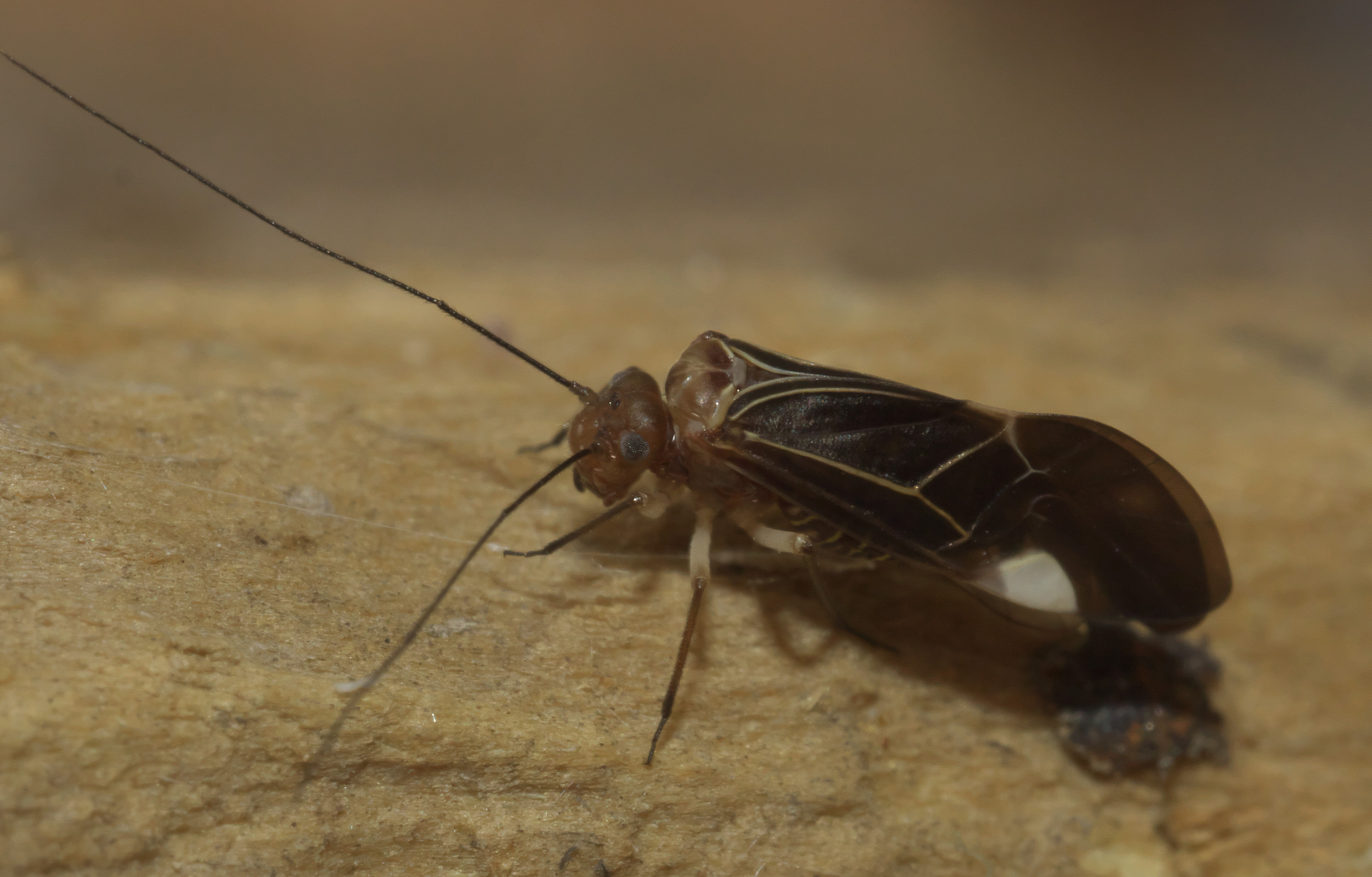
