= Hyalopsocus striatus =

Scientific classification
- Domain: Eukaryota
- Kingdom: Animalia
- Phylum: Arthropoda
- Class: Insecta
- Order: Psocodea
- Family: Psocidae
- Tribe: Psocini
- Genus: Hyalopsocus
- Species: H. striatus

Binomial name
- Hyalopsocus striatus (Walker, 1853)

Species of booklouse

Hyalopsocus striatus is a species of common barklouse in the family Psocidae. It is found in North America.
