= Cerastipsocus trifasciatus =

Scientific classification
- Domain: Eukaryota
- Kingdom: Animalia
- Phylum: Arthropoda
- Class: Insecta
- Order: Psocodea
- Family: Psocidae
- Subfamily: Psocinae
- Genus: Cerastipsocus
- Species: C. trifasciatus

Binomial name
- Cerastipsocus trifasciatus (Provancher, 1876)

Species of booklouse

Cerastipsocus trifasciatus is a species of common barklouse in the family Psocidae. It is found in Central America, North America, and South America.
