= Hyalopsocus morio =

Scientific classification
- Kingdom: Animalia
- Phylum: Arthropoda
- Class: Insecta
- Order: Psocodea
- Family: Psocidae
- Genus: Hyalopsocus
- Species: H. morio

Binomial name
- Hyalopsocus morio (Latreille, 1794)

Species of booklouse

Hyalopsocus morio is a black coloured species of Psocoptera from the Psocidae family that can be found in Great Britain, Ireland, Poland, Romania, and in every country of Western Europe (except for Finland, Luxembourg and Scandinavia).
