= Blaste persimilis =

Scientific classification
- Domain: Eukaryota
- Kingdom: Animalia
- Phylum: Arthropoda
- Class: Insecta
- Order: Psocodea
- Family: Psocidae
- Genus: Blaste
- Species: B. persimilis

Binomial name
- Blaste persimilis (Banks, 1908)

Species of booklouse

Blaste persimilis is a species of common barklouse in the family Psocidae. It is found in North America.
