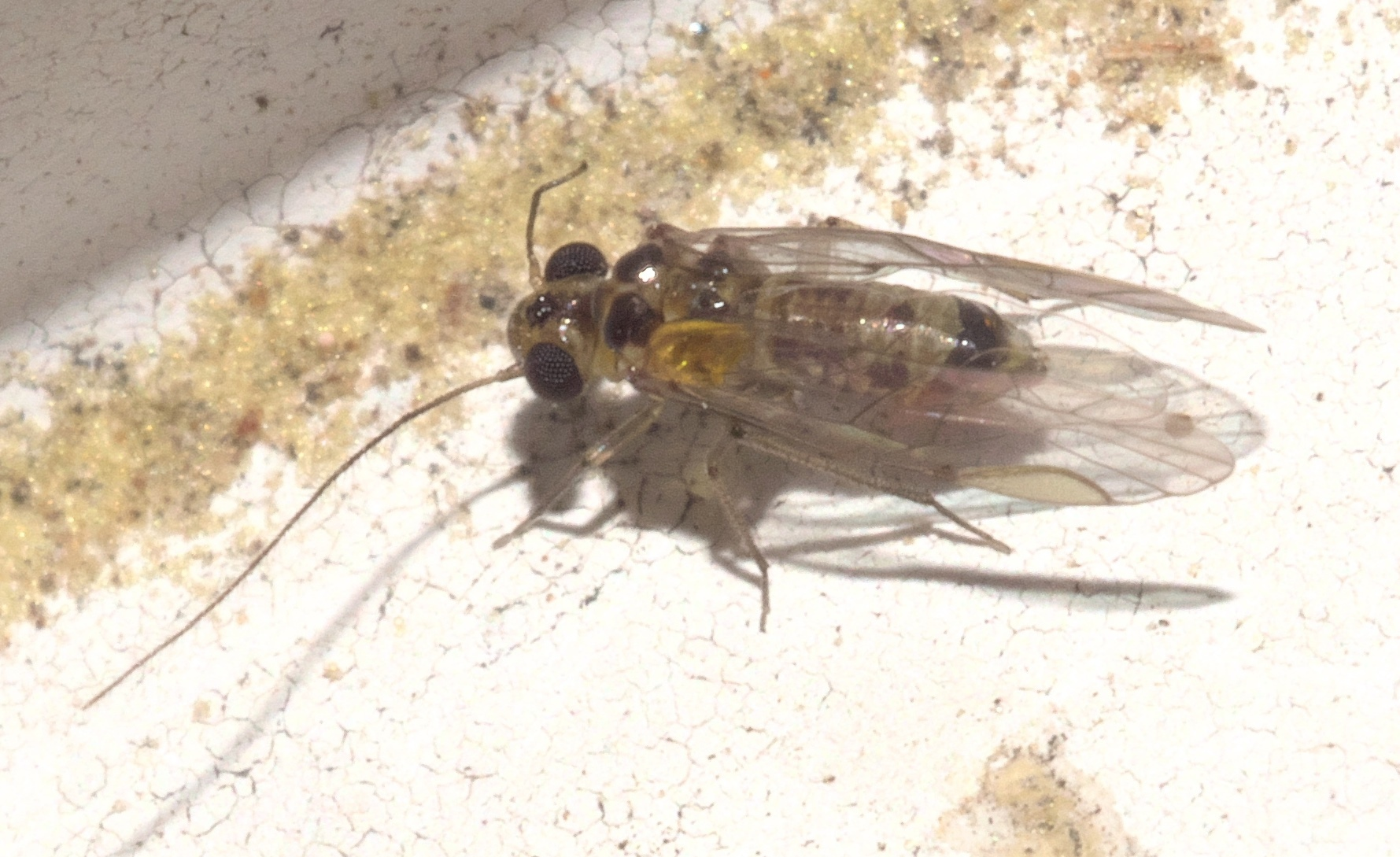
- Blastopsocus variabilis, Oklahoma

Scientific classification
- Domain: Eukaryota
- Kingdom: Animalia
- Phylum: Arthropoda
- Class: Insecta
- Order: Psocodea
- Family: Psocidae
- Genus: Blastopsocus
- Species: B. variabilis

Binomial name
- Blastopsocus variabilis (Aaron, 1883)

= Blastopsocus variabilis =

Species of booklouse

Blastopsocus variabilis is a species of common barklouse in the family Psocidae. It is found in Central America and North America.
