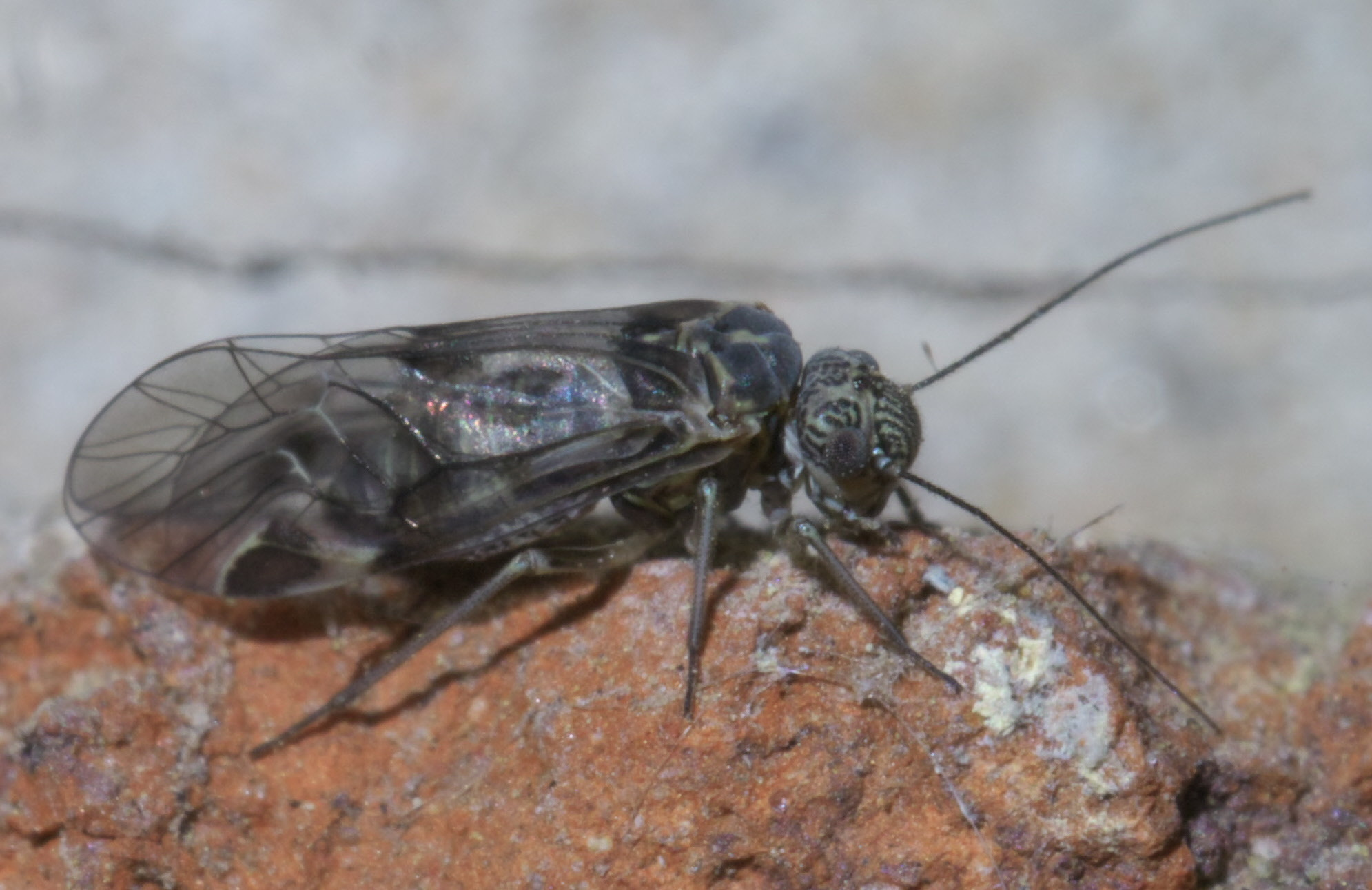
- Amphigerontia montivaga, Oklahoma

Scientific classification
- Domain: Eukaryota
- Kingdom: Animalia
- Phylum: Arthropoda
- Class: Insecta
- Order: Psocodea
- Family: Psocidae
- Genus: Amphigerontia
- Species: A. montivaga

Binomial name
- Amphigerontia montivaga (Chapman, 1930)

= Amphigerontia montivaga =

Species of booklouse

Amphigerontia montivaga is a species of common barklouse in the family Psocidae. It is found in Central America and North America.
