= Amphigerontia petiolata =

Scientific classification
- Domain: Eukaryota
- Kingdom: Animalia
- Phylum: Arthropoda
- Class: Insecta
- Order: Psocodea
- Family: Psocidae
- Genus: Amphigerontia
- Species: A. petiolata

Binomial name
- Amphigerontia petiolata (Banks, 1918)

Species of booklouse

Amphigerontia petiolata is a species of common barklouse in the family Psocidae. It is found in Central America and North America.
