= Lichenomima coloradensis =

Scientific classification
- Domain: Eukaryota
- Kingdom: Animalia
- Phylum: Arthropoda
- Class: Insecta
- Order: Psocodea
- Family: Myopsocidae
- Genus: Lichenomima
- Species: L. coloradensis

Binomial name
- Lichenomima coloradensis (Banks, 1907)

Species of booklouse

Lichenomima coloradensis is a species of mouse-like barklouse in the family Myopsocidae. It is found in North America.
