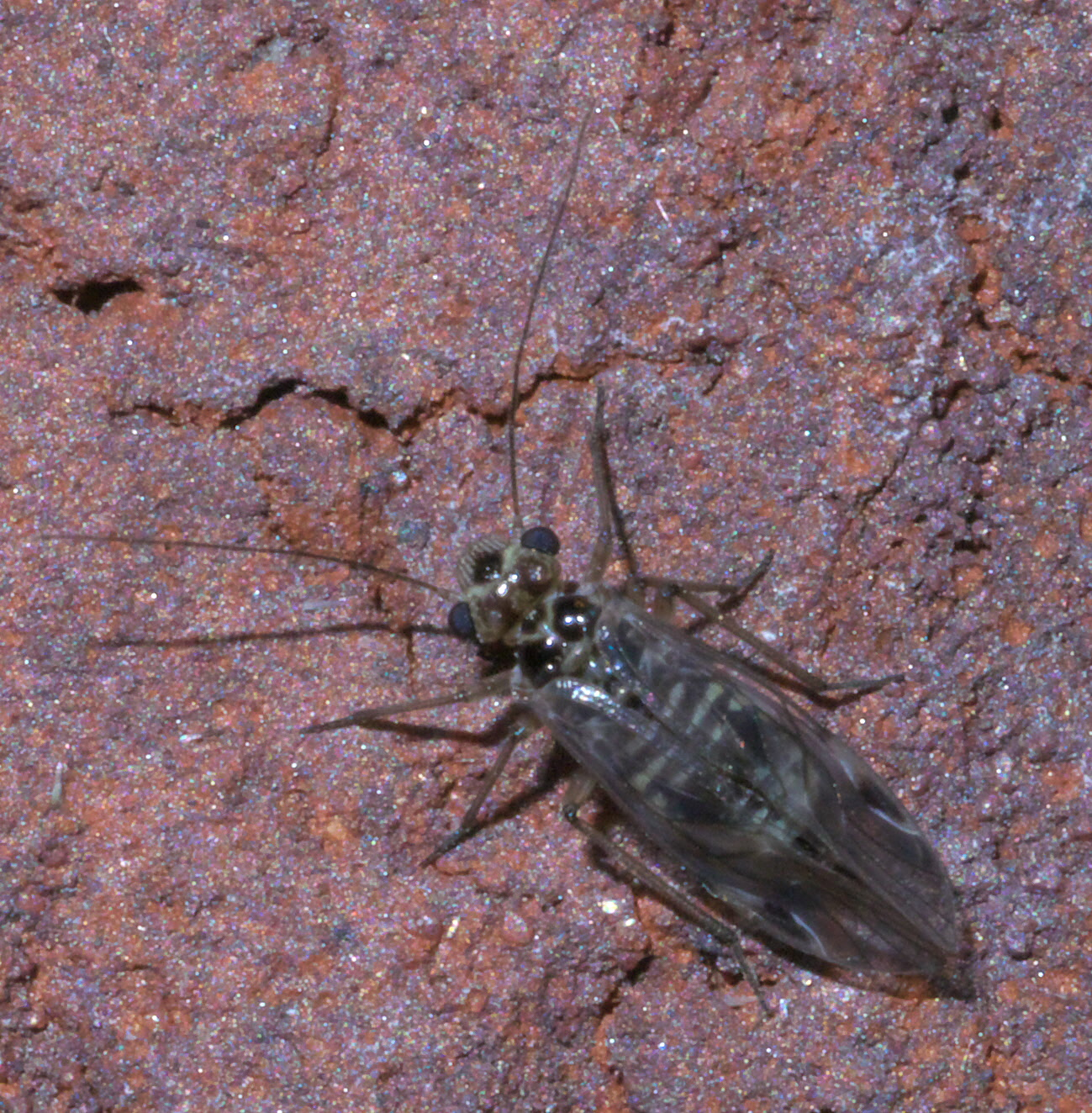

Scientific classification
- Domain: Eukaryota
- Kingdom: Animalia
- Phylum: Arthropoda
- Class: Insecta
- Order: Psocodea
- Family: Psocidae
- Genus: Blaste
- Species: B. quieta

Binomial name
- Blaste quieta (Hagen, 1861)

= Blaste quieta =

Species of booklouse

Blaste quieta is a species of common barklouse in the family Psocidae. It is found in Central America and North America.

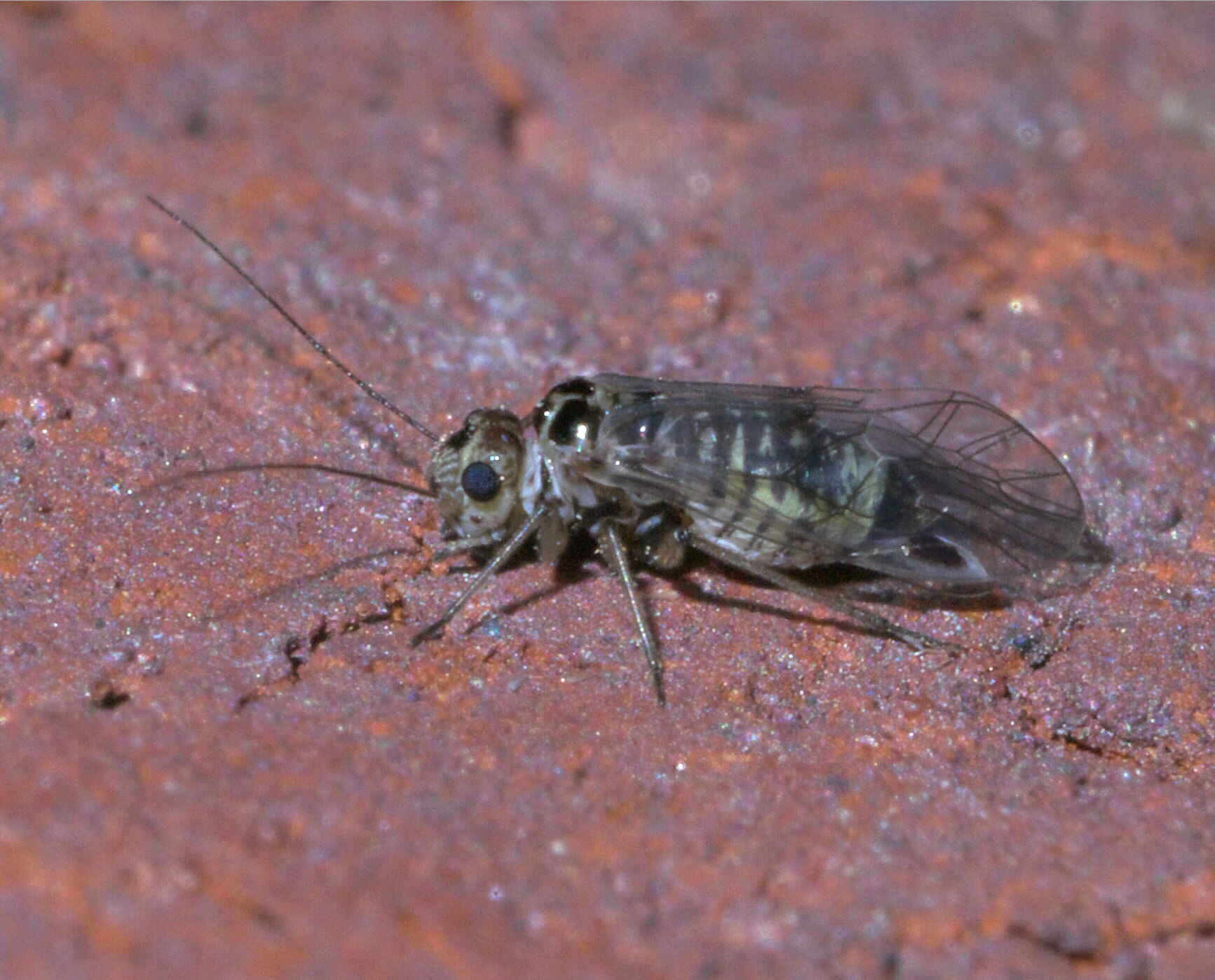

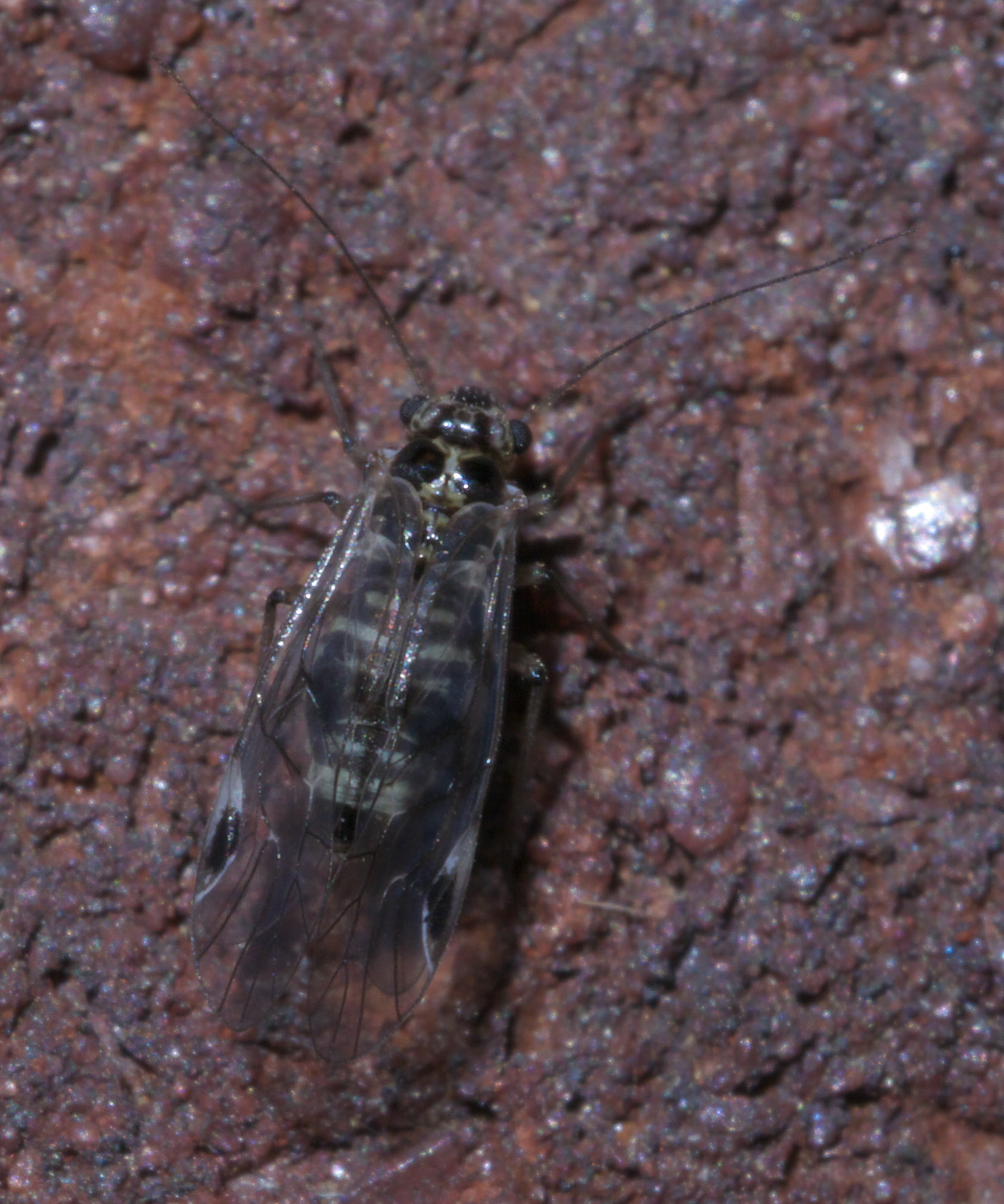
