= Psocus crosbyi =

Scientific classification
- Domain: Eukaryota
- Kingdom: Animalia
- Phylum: Arthropoda
- Class: Insecta
- Order: Psocodea
- Family: Psocidae
- Tribe: Psocini
- Genus: Psocus
- Species: P. crosbyi

Binomial name
- Psocus crosbyi Chapman, 1930

Species of booklouse

Psocus crosbyi is a species of common barklouse in the family Psocidae. It is found in North America.
