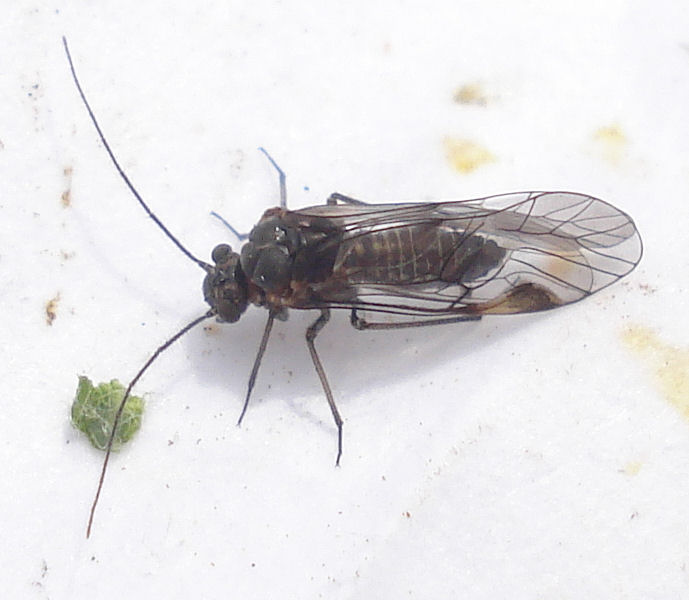
- Amphigerontia contaminata

Scientific classification
- Domain: Eukaryota
- Kingdom: Animalia
- Phylum: Arthropoda
- Class: Insecta
- Order: Psocodea
- Family: Psocidae
- Subfamily: Amphigerontiinae
- Genus: Amphigerontia; Kolbe, 1880

= Amphigerontia =

Genus of booklice

Amphigerontia is a genus of common barklice in the family Psocidae. There are more than 30 described species in Amphigerontia.

== Species ==
These 33 species belong to the genus Amphigerontia:

- Amphigerontia alticola New & Thornton, 1975
- Amphigerontia anchonae Li, 1989
- Amphigerontia anchorae Li, 2002
- Amphigerontia bifasciata (Latreille, 1799)
- Amphigerontia birabeni Williner, 1944
- Amphigerontia boliviana Navas, 1930
- Amphigerontia contaminata (Stephens, 1836)
- Amphigerontia diffusa Navas, 1933
- Amphigerontia feai Ribaga, 1908
- Amphigerontia guiyangica Li, 1990
- Amphigerontia hyalina Enderlein, 1925
- Amphigerontia incerta Ribaga, 1908
- Amphigerontia infernicola (Chapman, 1930)
- Amphigerontia intermedia (Tetens, 1891)
- Amphigerontia jezoensis Okamoto, 1907
- Amphigerontia lata Enderlein, 1926
- Amphigerontia lhasaensis Li, 2002
- Amphigerontia lhasana Li & Yang, 1987
- Amphigerontia limpida Navas, 1920
- Amphigerontia longicauda Mockford & Anonby, 2007
- Amphigerontia minutissima (Enderlein, 1908)
- Amphigerontia montivaga (Chapman, 1930)
- Amphigerontia nadleri Mockford, 1996
- Amphigerontia namiana Navas, 1920
- Amphigerontia nervosa Navas, 1932
- Amphigerontia petiolata (Banks, 1918)
- Amphigerontia shanxiensis Li, 2002
- Amphigerontia sicyoides Li, 2002
- Amphigerontia tincta Navas, 1920
- Amphigerontia titschacki Navas, 1927
- Amphigerontia umbrata Navas, 1927
- Amphigerontia unacrodonta Li, 2002
- Amphigerontia voeltzkowi Enderlein, 1908
