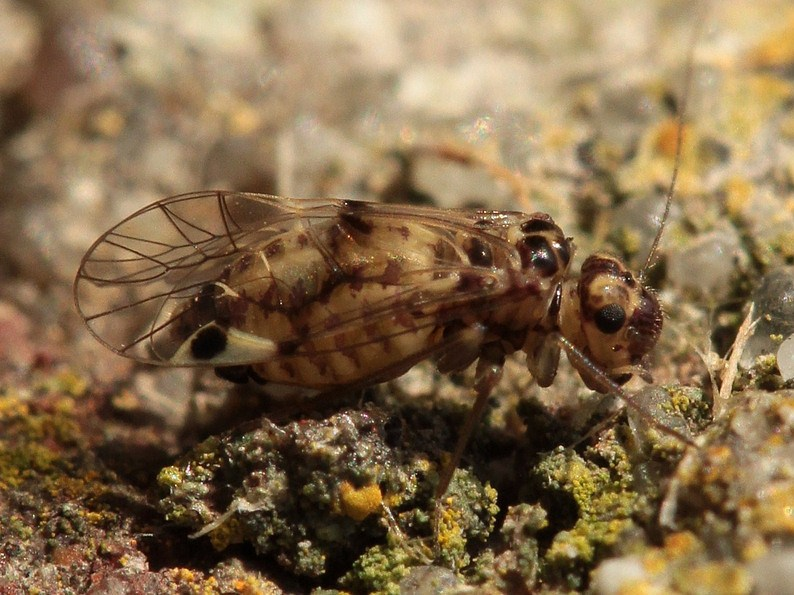
- Psocus bipunctatus

Scientific classification
- Kingdom: Animalia
- Phylum: Arthropoda
- Class: Insecta
- Order: Psocodea
- Family: Psocidae
- Subfamily: Psocinae
- Tribe: Psocini
- Genus: Psocus; Latreille, 1794

= Psocus =

Genus of booklice

Psocus is a genus of common barklice in the family Psocidae. There are about 17 described species in Psocus (the genus has been redefined more narrowly, after many unrelated species were described under its name). Psocus has been found to naturally occur in Europe and North America and the genus includes the largest known psocids.

== Species ==
These 17 species belong to the genus Psocus:

- Psocus alticolus Banks, 1937
- Psocus bipunctatus (Linnaeus, 1761)
- Psocus crosbyi Chapman, 1930
- Psocus cyllarus Banks, 1941
- Psocus dolorosus Banks, 1937
- Psocus illotus Banks, 1939
- Psocus incomptus Banks, 1937
- Psocus jeanneli Badonnel, 1945
- Psocus lapidarius Badonnel, 1936
- Psocus leidyi Aaron, 1886
- Psocus mucronicaudatus Li, 2002
- Psocus omissus Banks, 1939
- Psocus oneitus Banks, 1941
- Psocus rizali Banks, 1939
- Psocus saghaliensis Okamoto & Kuwayama, 1924
- Psocus socialis Li, 1997
- Psocus vannivalvulus Li, 1995
