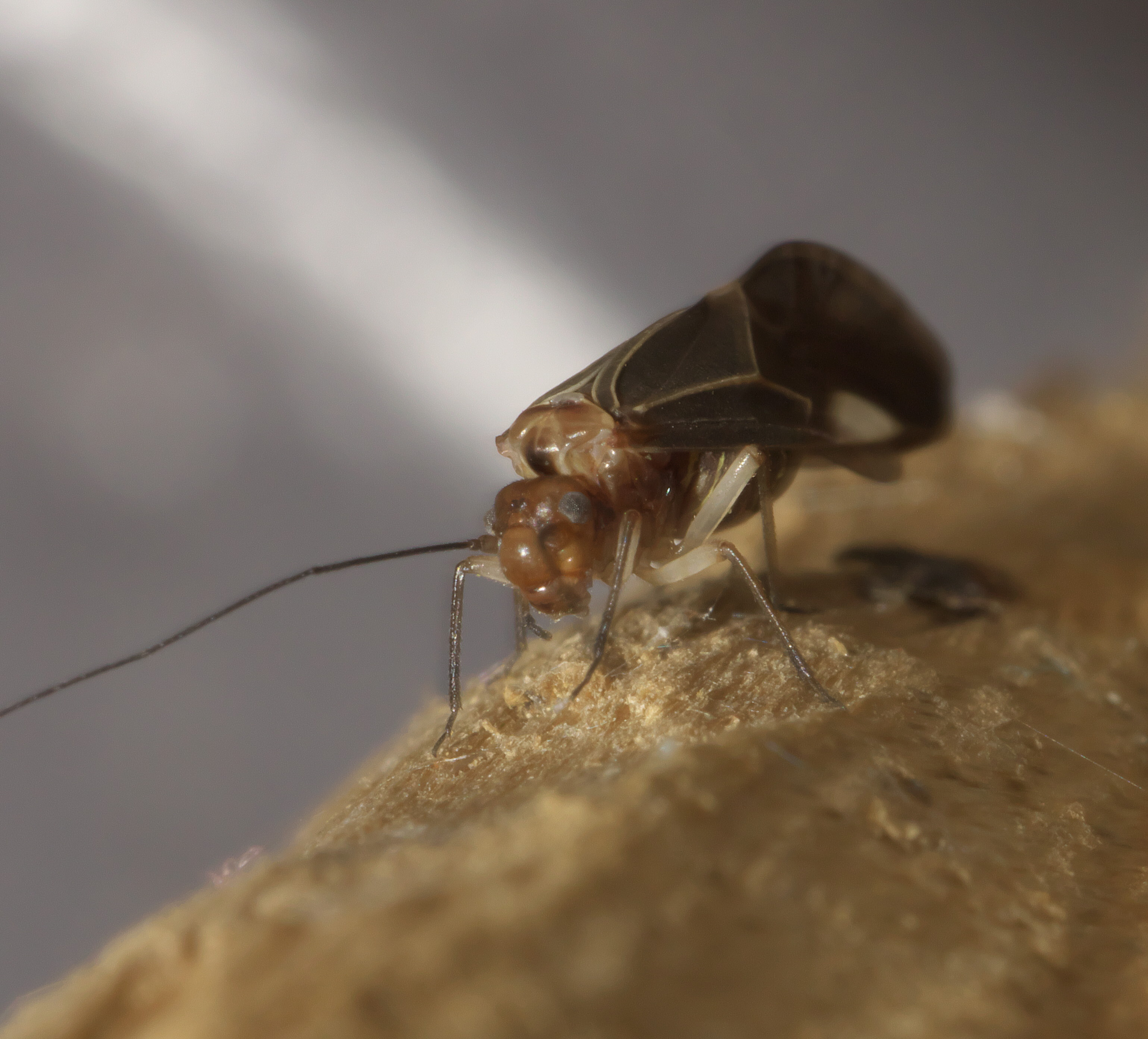
- Cerastipsocus venosus

Scientific classification
- Domain: Eukaryota
- Kingdom: Animalia
- Phylum: Arthropoda
- Class: Insecta
- Order: Psocodea
- Family: Psocidae
- Subfamily: Psocinae
- Genus: Cerastipsocus; Kolbe, 1884

= Cerastipsocus =

Genus of booklice

Cerastipsocus is a genus of common barklice in the family Psocidae. There are more than 20 described species in Cerastipsocus.

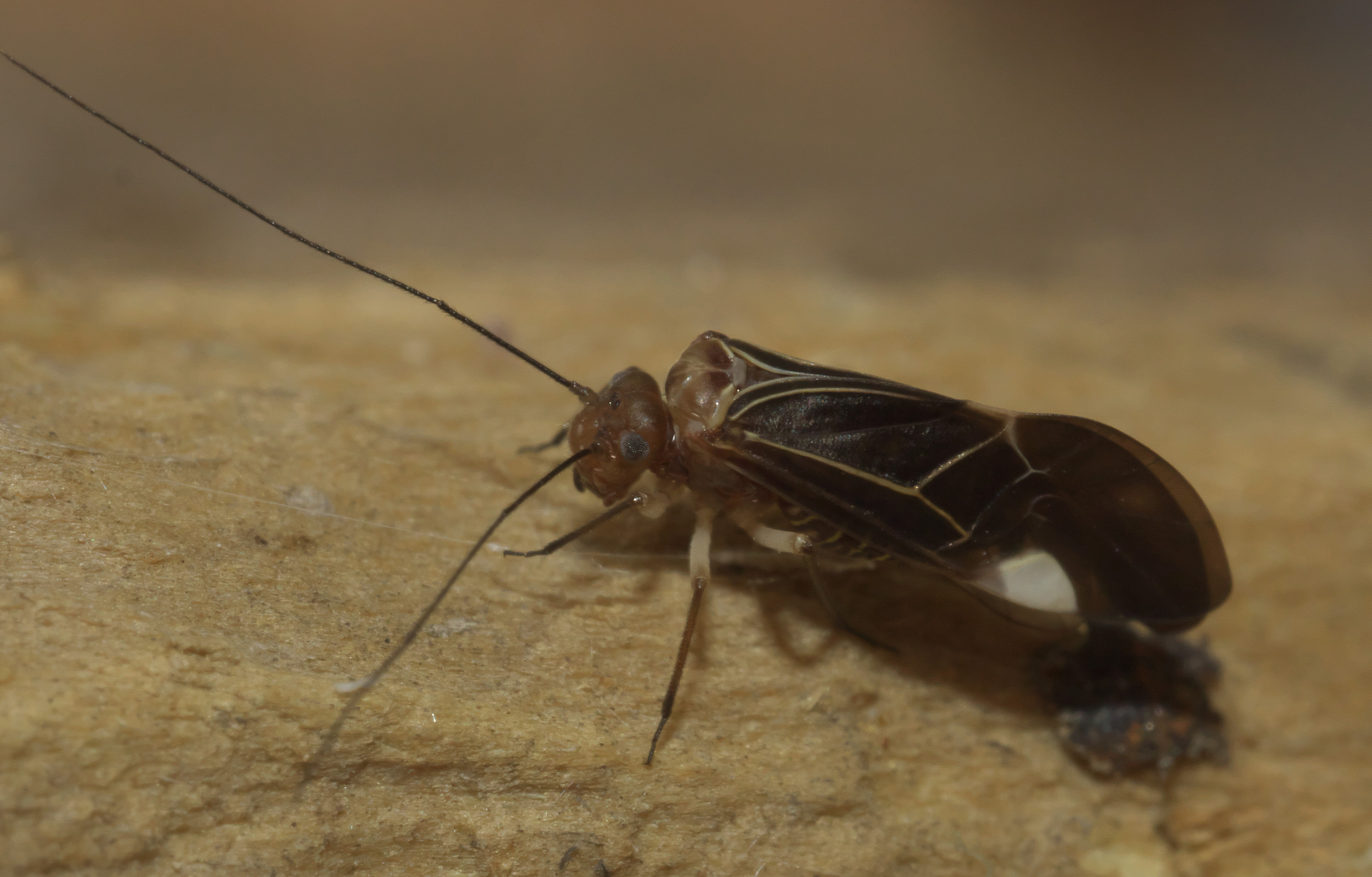
Cerastipsocus venosus

== Species ==
These 27 species belong to the genus Cerastipsocus:

- Cerastipsocus aldretei Badonnel, 1986
- Cerastipsocus beaveri New, 1972
- Cerastipsocus bogotanus (Kolbe, 1883)
- Cerastipsocus brasilianus (Enderlein, 1903)
- Cerastipsocus claripennis Mockford, 1996
- Cerastipsocus coloratus (Kolbe, 1883)
- Cerastipsocus consocius (Navas, 1934)
- Cerastipsocus cornutus Mockford, 1996
- Cerastipsocus cubanus Enderlein, 1919
- Cerastipsocus dubius Badonnel, 1969
- Cerastipsocus fuscipennis (Burmeister, 1839)
- Cerastipsocus iguazuensis (Williner, 1945)
- Cerastipsocus infectus (McLachlan, 1866)
- Cerastipsocus kolbei New, 1972
- Cerastipsocus macrostigmatus Li & Yang, 1987
- Cerastipsocus moestus (Kolbe, 1883)
- Cerastipsocus ochraceocristatus (Enderlein, 1900)
- Cerastipsocus pallidinervis (Kolbe, 1883)
- Cerastipsocus reductus (Banks, 1920)
- Cerastipsocus rufus (Navas, 1912)
- Cerastipsocus rugosus New & Thornton, 1975
- Cerastipsocus sivorii (Ribaga, 1908)
- Cerastipsocus tostus (Navas, 1924)
- Cerastipsocus trifasciatus (Provancher, 1876)
- Cerastipsocus venosus (Burmeister, 1839)
- Cerastipsocus vetustus (Kolbe, 1883)
- Cerastipsocus willineri New & Thornton, 1975
