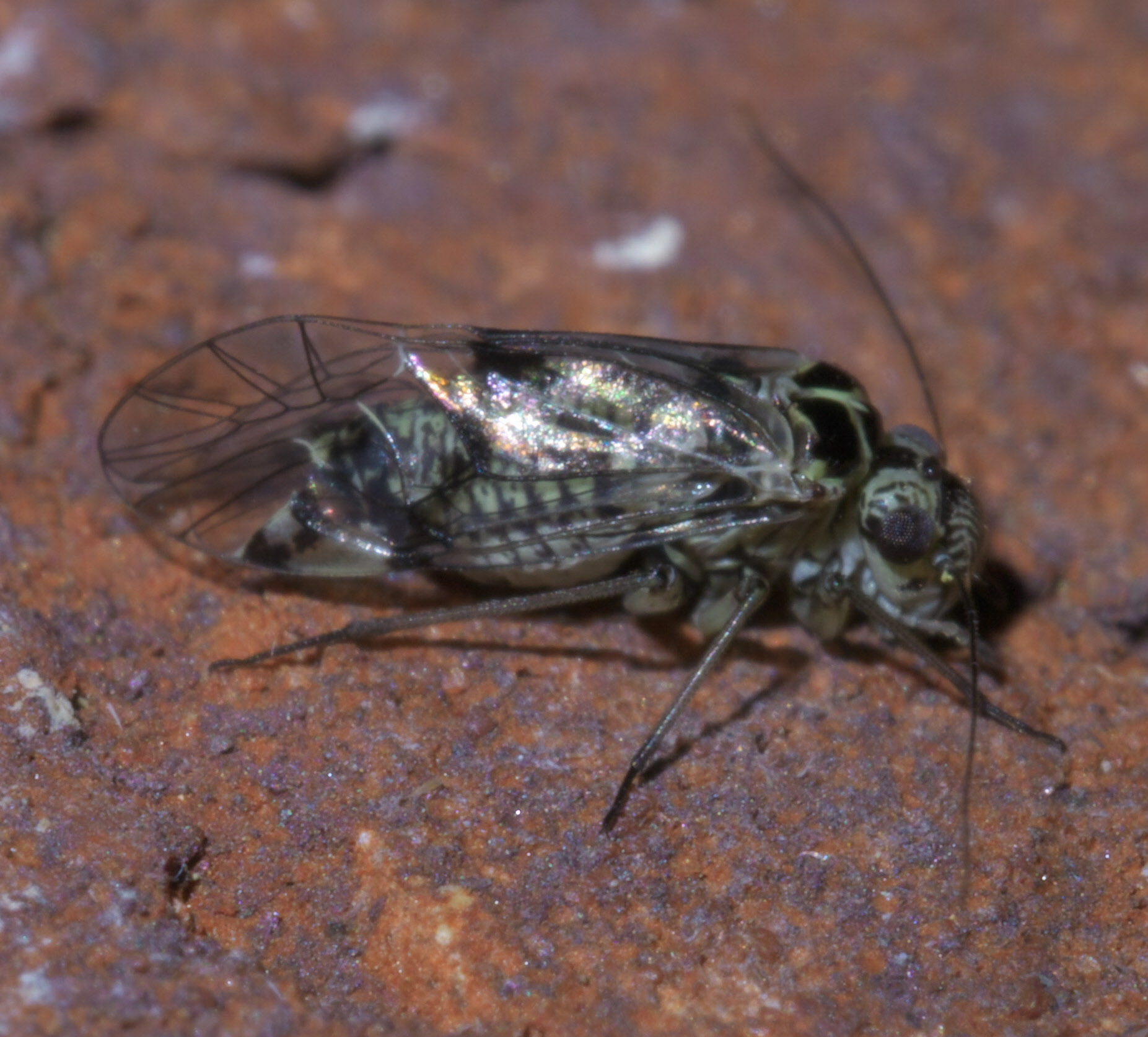

Scientific classification
- Domain: Eukaryota
- Kingdom: Animalia
- Phylum: Arthropoda
- Class: Insecta
- Order: Psocodea
- Family: Psocidae
- Subfamily: Psocinae
- Tribe: Psocini
- Genus: Hyalopsocus; Roesler, 1954

= Hyalopsocus =

Genus of booklice

Hyalopsocus is a genus of common barklice in the family Psocidae. There are about six described species in Hyalopsocus.

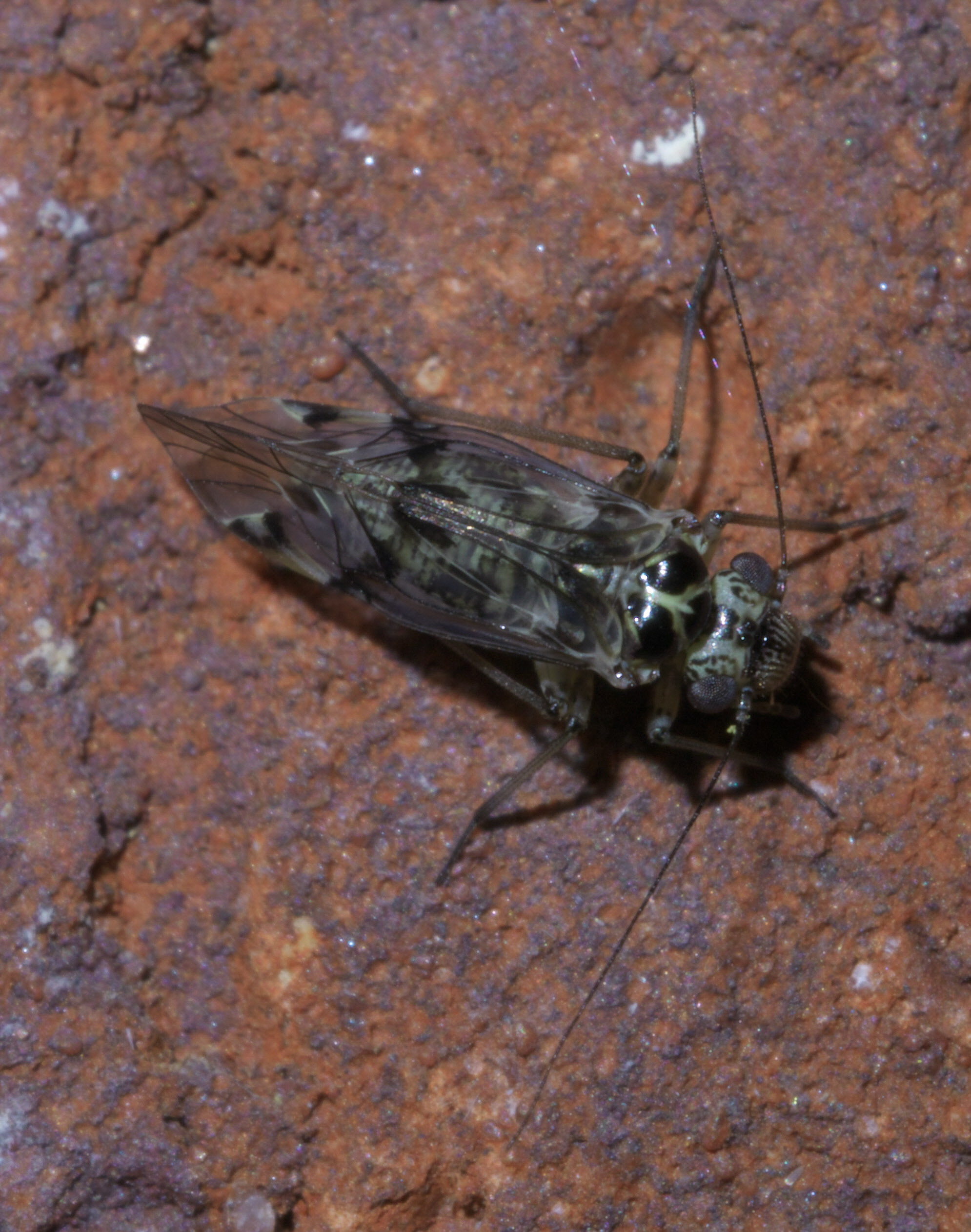

== Species ==
These six species belong to the genus Hyalopsocus:

- Hyalopsocus contrarius (Reuter, 1893)
- Hyalopsocus deltoides Li, 2002
- Hyalopsocus floridanus (Banks, 1905)
- Hyalopsocus gardinii (Lienhard, 1983)
- Hyalopsocus morio (Latreille, 1794)
- Hyalopsocus striatus (Walker, 1853)
