= Blastopsocus =

Scientific classification
- Domain: Eukaryota
- Kingdom: Animalia
- Phylum: Arthropoda
- Class: Insecta
- Order: Psocodea
- Family: Psocidae
- Subfamily: Amphigerontiinae
- Genus: Blastopsocus; Roesler, 1943

Genus of booklice

Blastopsocus is a genus of common barklice in the family Psocidae. There are about nine described species in Blastopsocus.

== Species ==
These nine species belong to the genus Blastopsocus:

- Blastopsocus angustus Smithers & Thornton, 1981
- Blastopsocus goodrichi Mockford, 2002
- Blastopsocus johnstoni Mockford, 2002
- Blastopsocus lithinus (Chapman, 1930)
- Blastopsocus mockfordi Badonnel, 1986
- Blastopsocus semistriatus (Walsh, 1862)
- Blastopsocus uncinatus (Thornton & Woo, 1973)
- Blastopsocus variabilis (Aaron, 1883)
- Blastopsocus walshi Mockford, 2002
