= Thyrsopsocus =

Scientific classification
- Domain: Eukaryota
- Kingdom: Animalia
- Phylum: Arthropoda
- Class: Insecta
- Order: Psocodea
- Family: Psocidae
- Subfamily: Thyrsophorinae
- Genus: Thyrsopsocus; Enderlein, 1900

Species
- Several, including: Thyrsopsocus elegans (Enderlein, 1925)

Synonyms
- Colpostigma (Enderlein, 1925); Thyrosphorus (Lienhard & Smithers, 2002)

Genus of booklice

Thyrsopsocus is a genus of Psocoptera in the family Psocidae.
