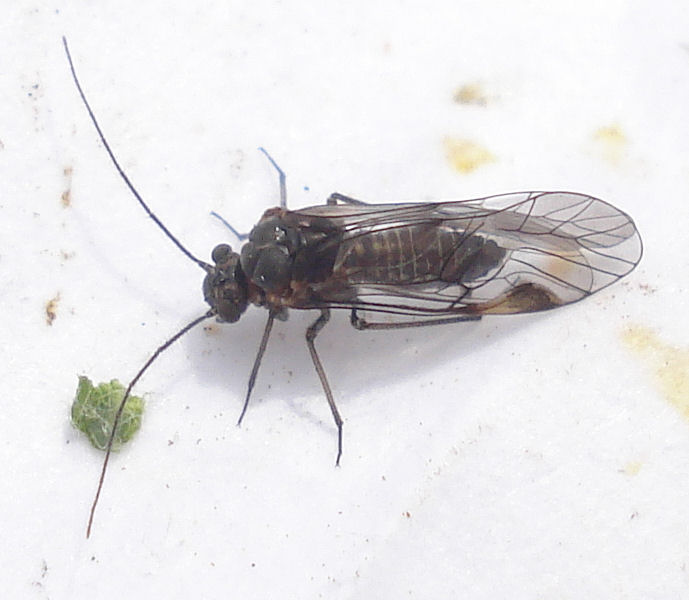

Scientific classification
- Domain: Eukaryota
- Kingdom: Animalia
- Phylum: Arthropoda
- Class: Insecta
- Order: Psocodea
- Family: Psocidae
- Genus: Amphigerontia
- Species: A. contaminata

Binomial name
- Amphigerontia contaminata (Stephens, 1836)

= Amphigerontia contaminata =

Species of booklouse

Amphigerontia contaminata is a species of psocopteran from Psocidae family. It is widely distributed in Europe (Austria, Belgium, Ireland, Finland, France, Germany, Greece, Hungary, Italy, Latvia, Luxembourg, the Netherlands, Norway, Poland, Romania, Spain, Switzerland, and the United Kingdom) and also occurs on Cyprus and on the Canary Islands. It is uncommon in Britain and scarce in Ireland. It is either light black or brown in colour.

== Habitat ==
It occurs on various trees including apple, birch, elder, hawthorn, hazel, oak and sea buckthorn.
