= Atropsocus =

Scientific classification
- Domain: Eukaryota
- Kingdom: Animalia
- Phylum: Arthropoda
- Class: Insecta
- Order: Psocodea
- Family: Psocidae
- Tribe: Psocini
- Genus: Atropsocus; Mockford, 1993
- Species: A. atratus

Binomial name
- Atropsocus atratus (Aaron, 1883)

Genus of booklice

Atropsocus is a genus of common barklice in the family Psocidae. There is one described species in Atropsocus, A. atratus.
