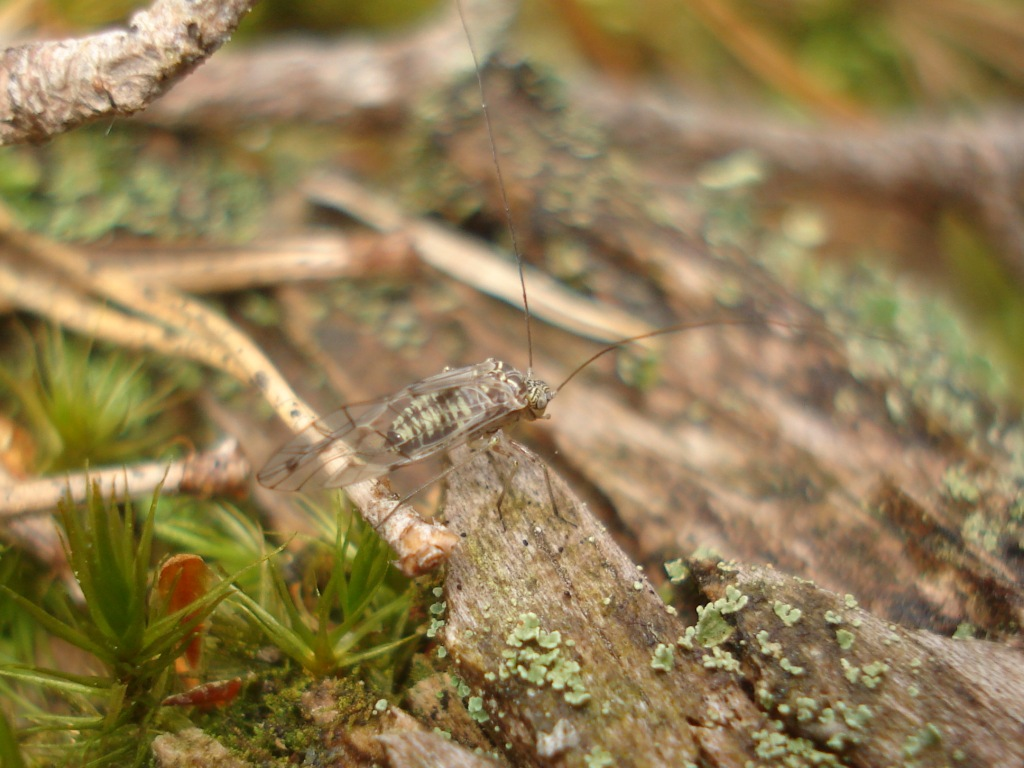
- Psococerastis gibbosa

Scientific classification
- Domain: Eukaryota
- Kingdom: Animalia
- Phylum: Arthropoda
- Class: Insecta
- Order: Psocodea
- Family: Psocidae
- Genus: Psococerastis; Pearman, 1932

= Psococerastis =

Genus of insects

Psococerastis is a genus of insects belonging to the family Psocidae.

The species of this genus are found in Europe, Southeastern Asia and Southern America.

Species:

- Psococerastis albimaculata Li & Yang, 1988
- Psococerastis amazonica New, 1980
- Psococerastis ampullaris Li, 1992
- Psococerastis annae Thornton, 1984
- Psococerastis asiatica Datta, 1966
- Psococerastis aspinosa Endang, Thornton & New, 2002
- Psococerastis assamensis Datta, 1966
- Psococerastis aurata Li, 2002
- Psococerastis baihuashanensis Li, 2002
- Psococerastis baishanzuica Li, 1995
- Psococerastis bakeri (Banks, 1913)
- Psococerastis bengalensis (Kolbe, 1883)
- Psococerastis betulisuga Li, 2002
- Psococerastis bispinosa Endang, Thornton & New, 2002
- Psococerastis bomiensis Li & Yang, 1987
- Psococerastis boseiensis Li, 2002
- Psococerastis brachyneura Li, 2002
- Psococerastis brachypoda Li, 1990
- Psococerastis breviollis Li, 2001
- Psococerastis callangana (Enderlein, 1900)
- Psococerastis capitata (Okamoto, 1907)
- Psococerastis capitulatis Li, 1995
- Psococerastis chebalingensis Li, 1993
- Psococerastis collessi Smithers & Thornton, 1981
- Psococerastis cosmoptera (McLachlan, 1866)
- Psococerastis curvivalvae Li, 1990
- Psococerastis cuspidata Li, 1992
- Psococerastis deflecta Li, 2002
- Psococerastis denticuligis Li, 2002
- Psococerastis dicoccis Li, 1995
- Psococerastis discalis (Navas, 1920)
- Psococerastis dissidens Li, 2002
- Psococerastis duoipunctata Li, 2002
- Psococerastis emeiensis Li, 2002
- Psococerastis epunctata Li, 2004
- Psococerastis exilis Li, 2002
- Psococerastis fasciata Mockford, 1981
- Psococerastis fenestralis Li, 2002
- Psococerastis ficivorella (Okamoto, 1907)
- Psococerastis flavistigma (Kolbe, 1885)
- Psococerastis fluctimarginalis Li, 2002
- Psococerastis formosa Li, 2002
- Psococerastis fortunae Mockford, 1981
- Psococerastis fuelleborni (Enderlein, 1902)
- Psococerastis galeata Li, 2002
- Psococerastis gansuiensis Li, 2002
- Psococerastis ghesquierei Badonnel, 1949
- Psococerastis gibbosa (Sulzer, 1776)
- Psococerastis golfita Mockford, 1981
- Psococerastis gracilescens Li, 2002
- Psococerastis guangxiensis Li, 2002
- Psococerastis guizhouensis Li & Yang, 1988
- Psococerastis hageni New, 1972
- Psococerastis hainanensis Li, 2002
- Psococerastis huangshanensis Li, 2002
- Psococerastis huapingana Li, 2002
- Psococerastis hunanensis Li, 1992
- Psococerastis hunaniensis Li, 2001
- Psococerastis inaequimagna Li, 2001
- Psococerastis joannisi (Navas, 1934)
- Psococerastis kurokiana (Enderlein, 1906)
- Psococerastis lassbergi (Williner, 1945)
- Psococerastis lifashengi Endang, Thornton & New, 2002
- Psococerastis linearis Li, 1990
- Psococerastis lombokensis (Navas, 1927)
- Psococerastis luroris (Soehardjan & Hamann, 1959)
- Psococerastis luzonensis (Banks, 1916)
- Psococerastis macrotaenialis Li, 2002
- Psococerastis magniprocessus Li, 2005
- Psococerastis mali (Okamoto, 1907)
- Psococerastis malleata Li & Yang, 1987
- Psococerastis martensi New, 1987
- Psococerastis melanostigma Li, 2002
- Psococerastis microdonta Li, 2002
- Psococerastis moganshanensis Li, 1992
- Psococerastis murudensis (Karny, 1925)
- Psococerastis nepalensis New, 1971
- Psococerastis nigriventris Li, 1997
- Psococerastis nilae Datta, 1966
- Psococerastis nirvana (Banks, 1914)
- Psococerastis opulenta (Navas, 1930)
- Psococerastis orientalis (Navas, 1931)
- Psococerastis pandurata Li, 2002
- Psococerastis paraguayana (Ribaga, 1908)
- Psococerastis parallelica Li, 1992
- Psococerastis parasinensis New, 1975
- Psococerastis pelesi Badonnel, 1973
- Psococerastis pellucidatis Li & Yang, 1987
- Psococerastis phanerosticta Li, 2001
- Psococerastis pictiventris (Kolbe, 1883)
- Psococerastis pingtangensis Li, 1990
- Psococerastis pingxiangensis Li, 2002
- Psococerastis platynota Li, 2002
- Psococerastis platypis Li, 2002
- Psococerastis platyraphis Li, 1990
- Psococerastis platytaenia Li, 2002
- Psococerastis plicata Li, 2002
- Psococerastis polygonalis Li & Yang, 1987
- Psococerastis polystictis Li & Yang, 1987
- Psococerastis protractis Li, 2002
- Psococerastis psaronipunctata Li, 2002
- Psococerastis punctulosa Li, 2002
- Psococerastis pyralina (Kolbe, 1883)
- Psococerastis pyralinella Mockford, 1981
- Psococerastis pyriformis Li, 1995
- Psococerastis quadrisecta Li, 1993
- Psococerastis quinidentata Li, 1999
- Psococerastis rhondae New, 1978
- Psococerastis ryukyuensis Tsutsumi, 1964
- Psococerastis sangzhiensis Li, 1992
- Psococerastis scissilis Li, 1992
- Psococerastis sexpunctata Li, 2002
- Psococerastis shanxiensis Li, 2002
- Psococerastis shennongjiana Li, 2002
- Psococerastis sinensis Thornton, 1960
- Psococerastis spatiosis Li, 2002
- Psococerastis stictica (Banks, 1920)
- Psococerastis stipularis Li, 1997
- Psococerastis stulticaulis Li, 1989
- Psococerastis taprobanes (Hagen, 1858)
- Psococerastis thomasseti Pearman, 1934
- Psococerastis tianmushanensis Li, 2002
- Psococerastis tibetensis Li & Yang, 1987
- Psococerastis tokyoensis (Enderlein, 1906)
- Psococerastis trichotoma Li & Yang, 1987
- Psococerastis trilobata Li & Yang, 1987
- Psococerastis turriformis Li, 2002
- Psococerastis urceolaris Li, 2002
- Psococerastis venigra Li & Yang, 1992
- Psococerastis venimaculis Li & Yang, 1987
- Psococerastis weijuni Li, 2002
- Psococerastis yunnanensis Li, 2002
- Psococerastis yuwan Tsutsumi, 1964
- Psococerastis zambeziana (Badonnel, 1932)
- Psococerastis zayuensis Li & Yang, 1987
- Psococerastis zhaoi Li, 1999
