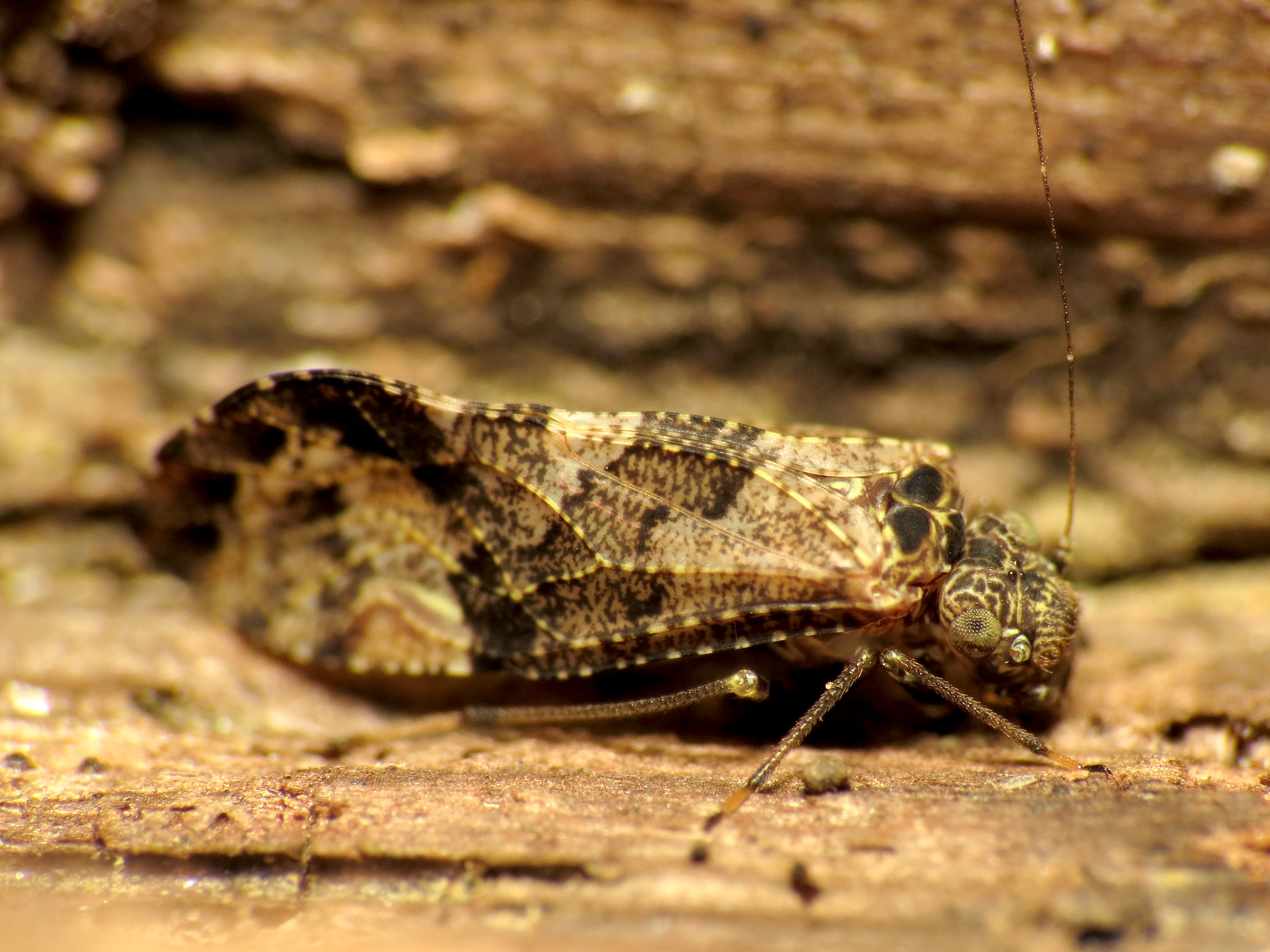

Scientific classification
- Domain: Eukaryota
- Kingdom: Animalia
- Phylum: Arthropoda
- Class: Insecta
- Order: Psocodea
- Family: Myopsocidae
- Genus: Lichenomima; Enderlein, 1910

= Lichenomima =

Genus of booklice

Lichenomima is a genus of mouse-like barklice in the family Myopsocidae. There are more than 40 described species in Lichenomima.

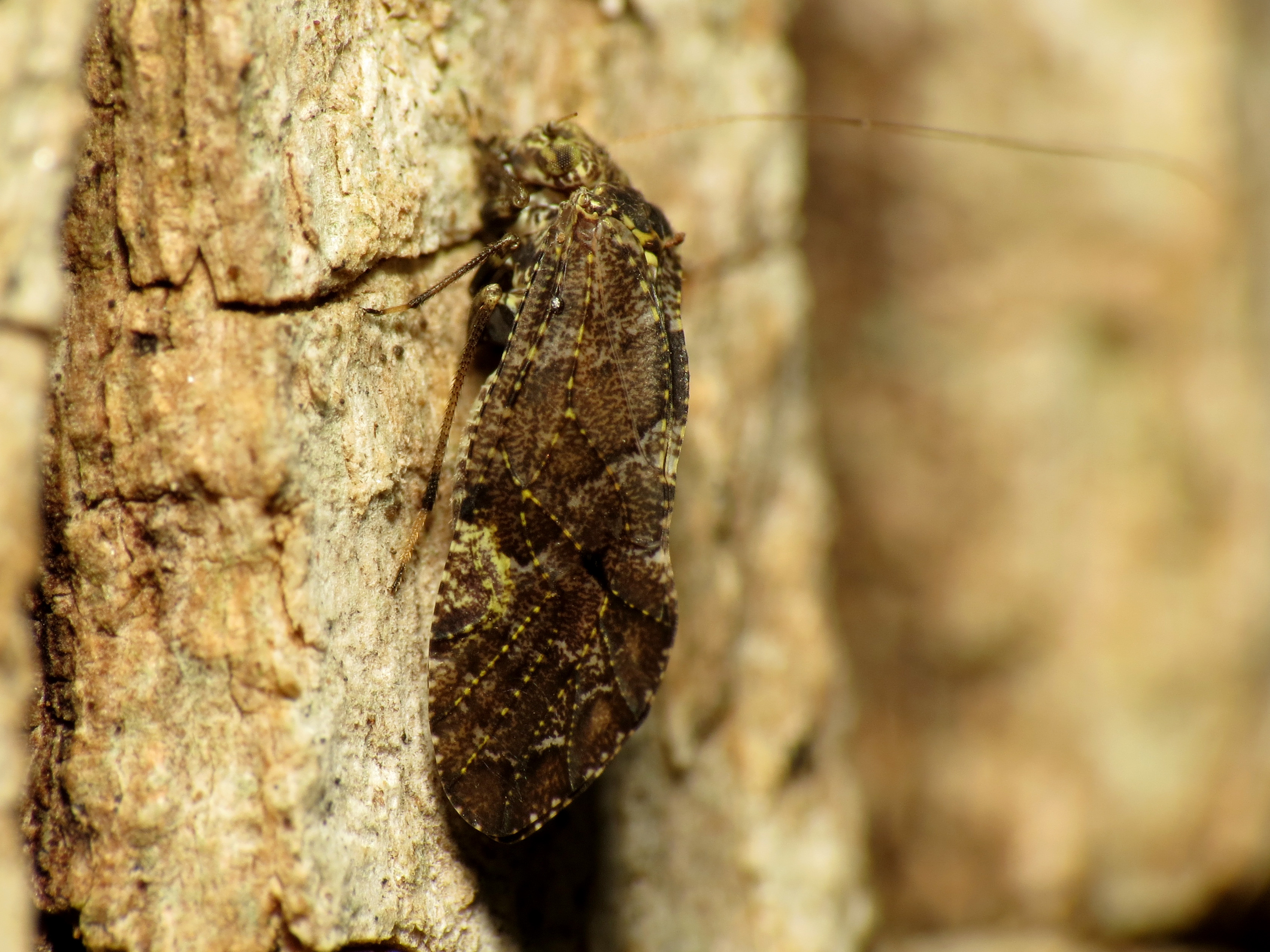

== Species ==
These 49 species belong to the genus Lichenomima:

- Lichenomima ampla (Smithers & Thornton, 1974)
- Lichenomima argentina Williner, 1944
- Lichenomima ariasi (New, 1980)
- Lichenomima burgeoni (Navas, 1936)
- Lichenomima cameruna (Enderlein, 1903)
- Lichenomima capeneri (Smithers, 1973)
- Lichenomima cervantesi Garcia Aldrete, 1994
- Lichenomima chelata (Thornton & Woo, 1973)
- Lichenomima clypeofasciata (Mockford, 1974)
- Lichenomima coloradensis (Banks, 1907)
- Lichenomima conspersa Enderlein, 1910
- Lichenomima corniculata Li, 1995
- Lichenomima cubitalis Lienhard, 2004
- Lichenomima cylindra Li, 2002
- Lichenomima elongata (Thornton, 1960)
- Lichenomima excavata Li, 2002
- Lichenomima fasciata Badonnel, 1946
- Lichenomima fenestrata Enderlein, 1926
- Lichenomima gibbulosa Li, 2002
- Lichenomima guineensis Enderlein, 1914
- Lichenomima hamata Li, 1995
- Lichenomima hangzhouensis Li, 2002
- Lichenomima harpeodes Li, 2002
- Lichenomima indica Datta, 1969
- Lichenomima intermedia Pearman, 1934
- Lichenomima leucospila Li, 2002
- Lichenomima lugens (Hagen, 1861)
- Lichenomima machadoi (Badonnel, 1977)
- Lichenomima maxima Smithers, 1957
- Lichenomima medialis (Thornton, 1981)
- Lichenomima merapi Thornton & Browning, 1992
- Lichenomima muscosa (Enderlein, 1906)
- Lichenomima onca Mockford, 1991
- Lichenomima orbiculata Li, 2002
- Lichenomima oxycera Li, 2002
- Lichenomima pauliani Badonnel, 1949
- Lichenomima posterior (Navas, 1927)
- Lichenomima pulchella (New & Thornton, 1975)
- Lichenomima punctipennis Mockford, 1996
- Lichenomima sanguensis (New, 1973)
- Lichenomima schoutedeni Badonnel, 1946
- Lichenomima sinuosa Lienhard, 2004
- Lichenomima sparsa (Hagen, 1861)
- Lichenomima sumatrana (Enderlein, 1906)
- Lichenomima thorntoni Mockford, 1991
- Lichenomima timmei Mockford, 1991
- Lichenomima tridens Li, 2002
- Lichenomima unicornis Li, 2002
- Lichenomima varia (Navas, 1927)
