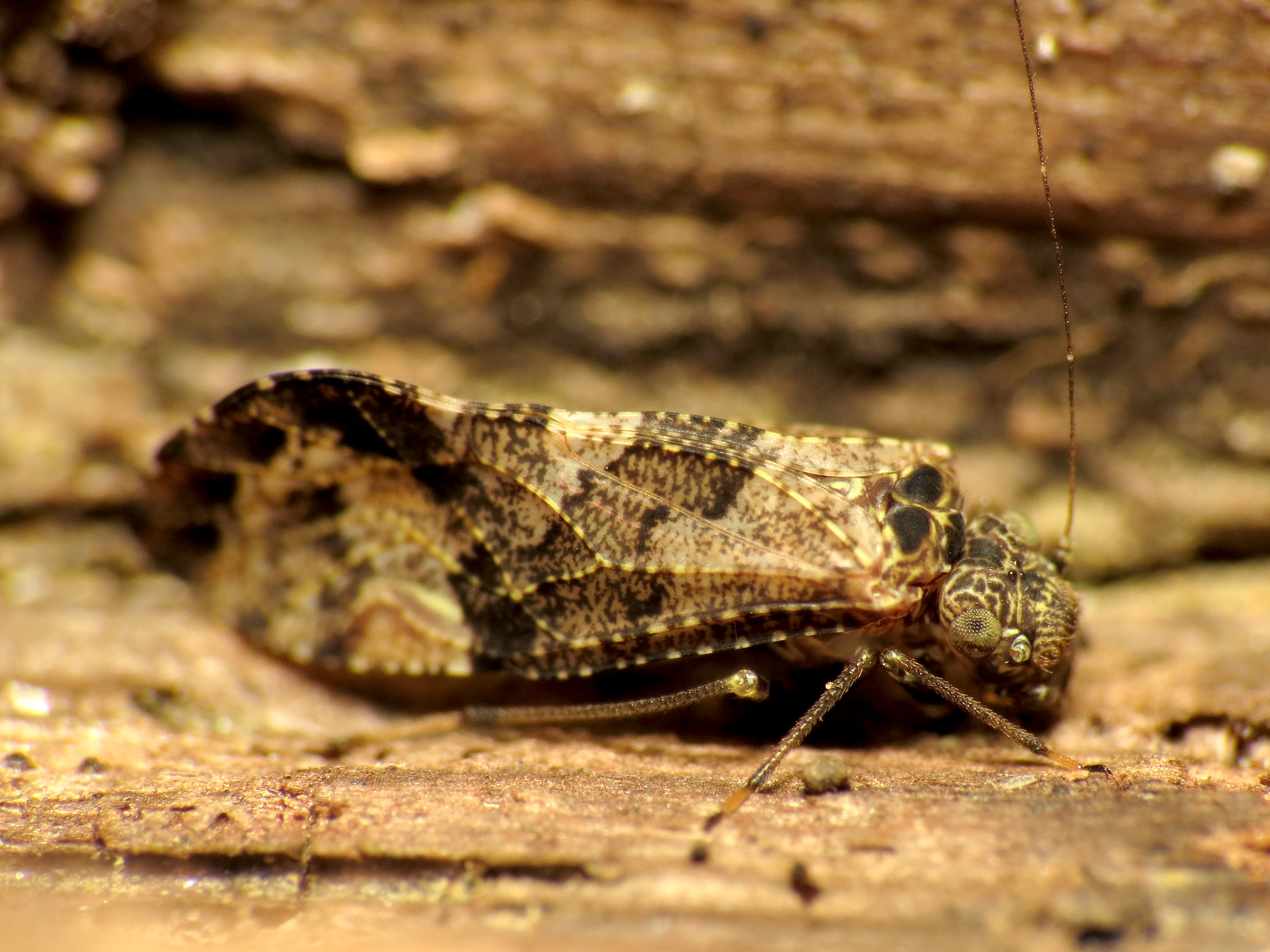
- Lichenomima

Scientific classification
- Kingdom: Animalia
- Phylum: Arthropoda
- Clade: Pancrustacea
- Class: Insecta
- Order: Psocodea
- Suborder: Psocomorpha
- Infraorder: Psocetae
- Family: Myopsocidae

= Myopsocidae =

Family of booklice

Myopsocidae is a family of mouse-like barklice, belonging to the infraorder Psocetae of the order Psocodea (formerly Psocoptera). This family is closely related to Psocidae, with which it shares similar wing-venation, but from which it is distinguished by three-segmented tarsi.

There are about 8 genera and at least 180 described species in Myopsocidae.

== Genera ==
These eight genera belong to the family Myopsocidae:

- Gyromyus^{c g}
- Lichenomima Enderlein, 1910^{i c g b}
- Lophopterygella^{c g}
- Mouldsia^{c g}
- Myopsocus Hagen, 1866^{i c g b}
- Nimbopsocus^{c g}
- Smithersia^{c g}
- Thorntonodes^{c g}

Data sources: i = ITIS, c = Catalogue of Life, g = GBIF, b = Bugguide.net

== Sources ==
- Lienhard, C. & Smithers, C. N. 2002. Psocoptera (Insecta): World Catalogue and Bibliography. Instrumenta Biodiversitatis, vol. 5. Muséum d'histoire naturelle, Genève.
