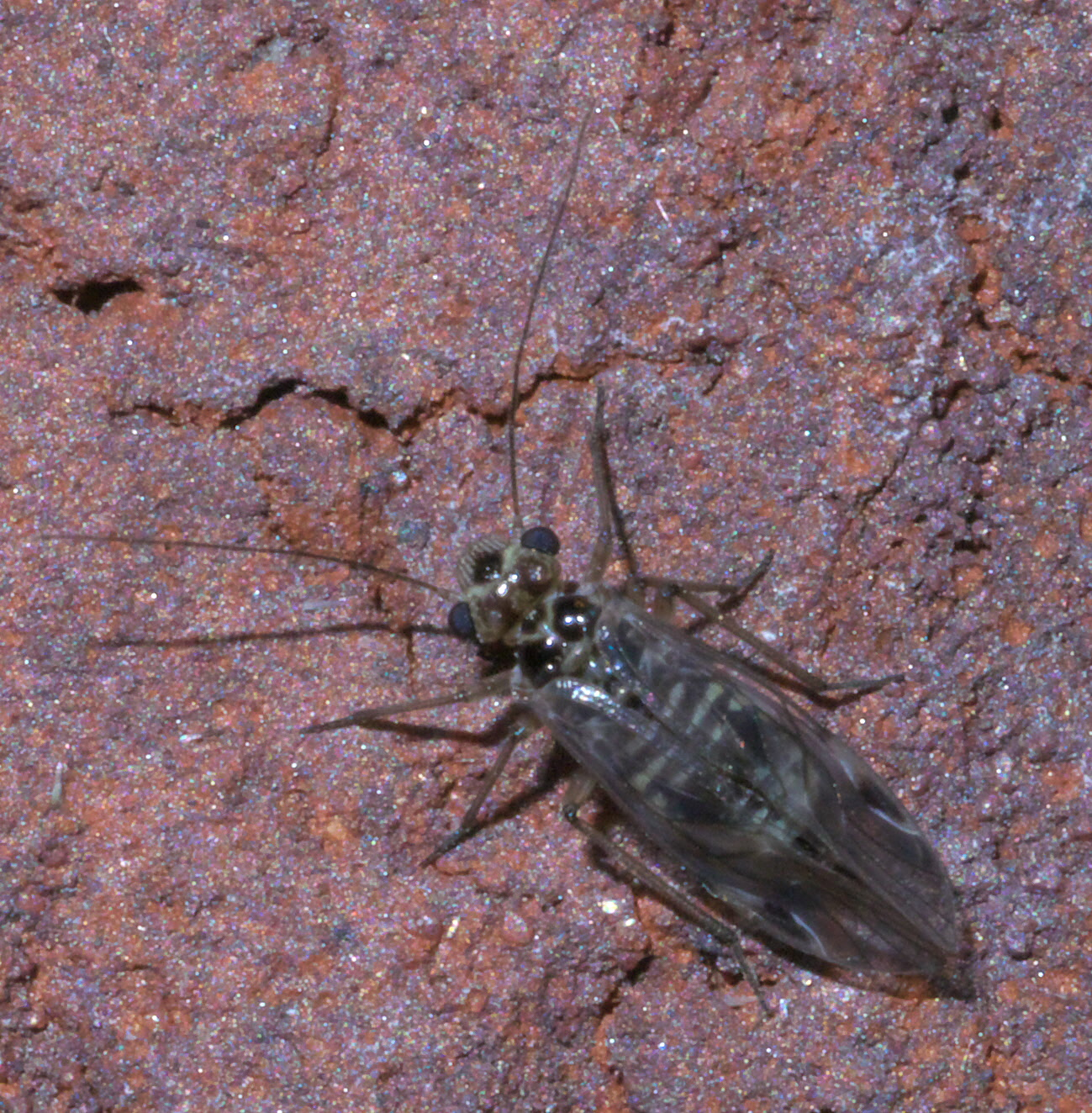
- Blaste quieta

Scientific classification
- Domain: Eukaryota
- Kingdom: Animalia
- Phylum: Arthropoda
- Class: Insecta
- Order: Psocodea
- Family: Psocidae
- Subfamily: Amphigerontiinae
- Genus: Blaste; Kolbe, 1883

Diversity
- at least 110 species

= Blaste =

Insect genus

Blaste is a genus of common barklice in the family Psocidae. There are more than 100 described species in Blaste.

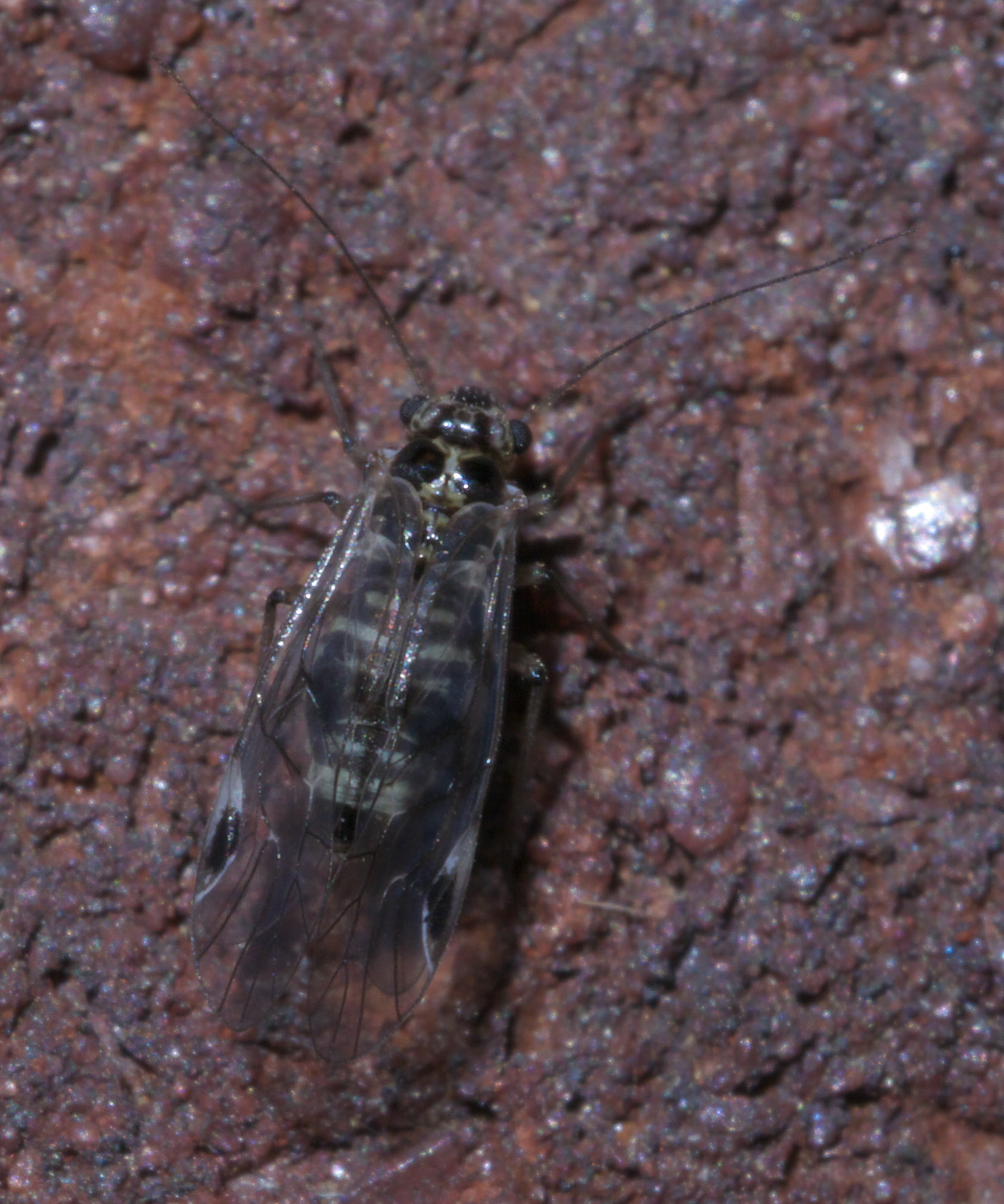
Blaste quieta

== See also ==
- List of Blaste species
