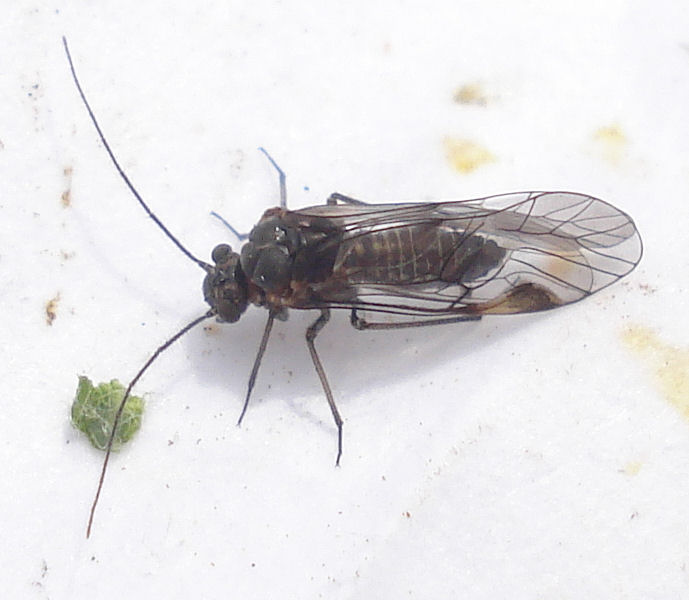
- Amphigerontia contaminata

Scientific classification
- Kingdom: Animalia
- Phylum: Arthropoda
- Clade: Pancrustacea
- Class: Insecta
- Order: Psocodea
- Suborder: Psocomorpha
- Infraorder: Psocetae
- Family: Psocidae

Subfamilies
- Amphigerontiinae; Psocinae; Thyrsophorinae

= Psocidae =

Family of booklice

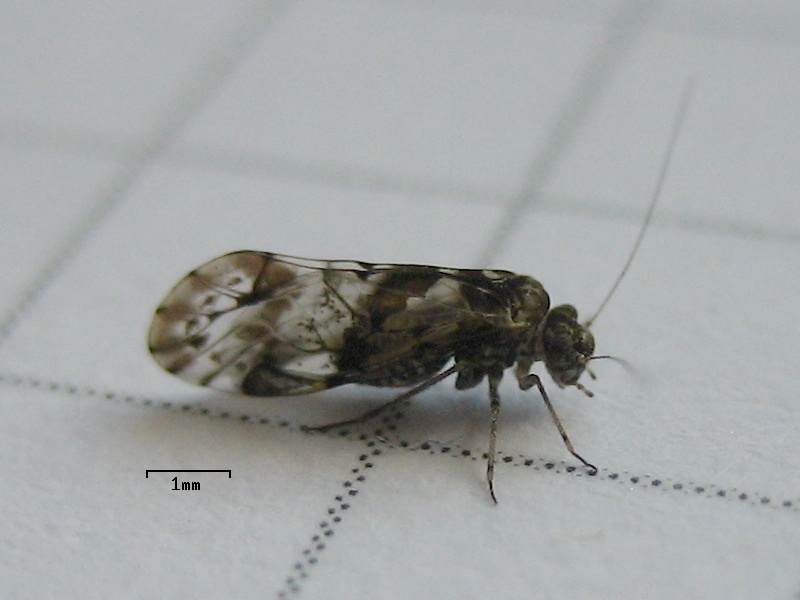
Trichadenotecnum sexpunctatum

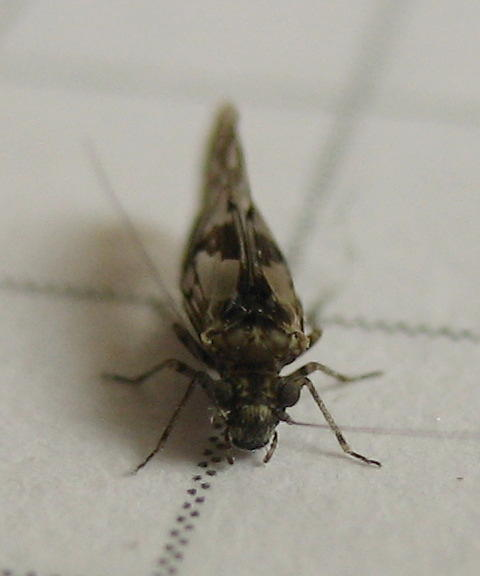
Trichadenotecnum sexpunctatum

Psocidae is a family of barklice in the order Psocodea (formerly Psocoptera).

Members of this family are recognized by their wing-venation, where the areola postica is fused to the M-vein, giving rise to the so-called discoidal cell. This family is closely related to Myopsocidae. The family is widespread, including New Zealand.

== Genera ==
These 86 genera belong to the family Psocidae:

- Amphigerontia Kolbe, 1880^{i c g b}
- Anomaloblaste^{c g}
- Arabopsocus^{c g}
- Atlantopsocus^{c g}
- Atrichadenotecnum^{c g}
- Atropsocus Mockford, 1993^{i c g b}
- Barrowia^{c g}
- Blaste Kolbe, 1883^{i c g b}
- Blastopsocidus^{c g}
- Blastopsocus Roesler, 1943^{i c g b}
- Brachinodiscus^{c g}
- Camelopsocus Mockford, 1965^{i c g b}
- Cephalopsocus^{c g}
- Cerastipsocus Kolbe, 1884^{i c g b}
- Ceratostigma^{c g}
- Cervopsocus^{c g}
- Chaetoblaste^{c g}
- Chaetopsocidus^{c g}
- Chilopsocus^{c g}
- Clematoscenea^{c g}
- Clematostigma^{c g}
- Copostigma^{c g}
- Cycetes^{c g}
- Cyclotus Swainson, 1840^{i c g}
- Dactylopsocus^{c g}
- Dictyopsocus^{c g}
- Diplacanthoda^{c g}
- Disopsocus^{c g}
- Elaphopsocoides^{c g}
- Elaphopsocus^{c g}
- Elytropsocus^{c g}
- Epiblaste^{c g}
- Eremopsocus^{c g}
- Euclismioides^{c g}
- Fashenglianus^{c g}
- Ghesquierella^{c g}
- Gigantopsocus^{c g}
- Glossoblaste^{c g}
- Hyalopsocus Roesler, 1954^{i c g b}
- Hybopsocus^{c g}
- Indiopsocus Mockford, 1974^{i c g b}
- Indoblaste^{c g}
- Javablaste^{c g}
- Javapsocus^{c g}
- Kaindipsocus^{c g}
- Kimunpsocus^{c g}
- Lacroixiella^{c g}
- Lasiopsocus^{c g}
- Lativalva^{c g}
- Lipsocus^{c g}
- Loensia Enderlein, 1924^{i c g b}
- Longivalvus^{c g}
- Lubricus^{c g}
- Mecampsis^{c g}
- Metylophorus Pearman, 1932^{i c g b}
- Neoblaste^{c g}
- Neopsocopsis^{c g}
- Neopsocus^{c g}
- Ophthalmopsocus^{c g}
- Oreopsocus^{c g}
- Pearmania^{c g}
- Pilipsocus^{c g}
- Poecilopsocus^{c g}
- Pogonopsocus^{c g}
- Propsococerastis^{c g}
- Pseudoclematus^{c g}
- Pseudoptycta^{c g}
- Psocidus^{c g}
- Psococerastis^{c g}
- Psocomesites^{c g}
- Psocus Latreille, 1794^{i c g b}
- Ptycta Enderlein, 1925^{i c g b}
- Sacopsocus^{c g}
- Sciadionopsocus^{c g}
- Setopsocus^{c g}
- Sigmatoneura^{c g}
- Steleops Enderlein, 1910^{i c g b}
- Stylatopsocus^{c g}
- Sundapsocus^{c g}
- Symbiopsocus^{c g}
- Tanystigma^{c g}
- Thyrsophorus^{c g}
- Thyrsopsocopsis^{c g}
- Thyrsopsocus^{c g}
- Trichadenopsocus^{c g}
- Trichadenotecnum Enderlein, 1909^{i c g b}

Data sources: i = ITIS, c = Catalogue of Life, g = GBIF, b = Bugguide.net
