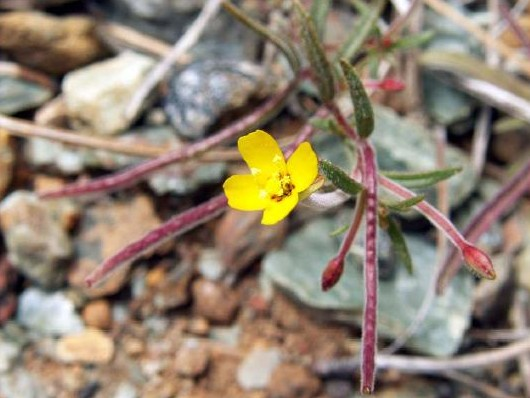
- Camissonia benitensis

Scientific classification
- Kingdom: Plantae
- Clade: Tracheophytes
- Clade: Angiosperms
- Clade: Eudicots
- Clade: Rosids
- Order: Myrtales
- Family: Onagraceae
- Subfamily: Onagroideae
- Tribe: Onagreae
- Genus: Camissonia; Link

= Camissonia =

Genus of flowering plants

Camissonia, sometimes commonly known as sun cup or sundrop, is a genus of annual and perennial plants in the evening primrose family Onagraceae. A total of 12 species are known, nearly all from western North America, especially in the California Floristic Province, but also one from South America. Previous circumscriptions of the genus had recognized up to 62 species before it was split among other closely related genera.

The flowers generally open at dawn and are yellow. They are usually cup-shaped, thus the common name.

Formerly included in Oenothera, the species of Camissonia are distinguished by having a club- or head-shaped stigma, instead of the 4-part-divided stigma of Oenothera or Clarkia.

Camissonia species are used as food plants by the larvae of some Lepidoptera species including Schinia cupes and Schinia deserticola, both of which feed on C. claviformis, the latter exclusively.

The genus is named after the botanist Adelbert von Chamisso.

== Selected species ==
According to The Plant List, the genus includes the following accepted species:

- Camissonia andina (Nutt.) P.H.Raven
- Camissonia bairdii S.L.Welsh
- Camissonia benitensis P.H.Raven
- Camissonia breviflora (Torr. & A.Gray) P.H.Raven
- Camissonia campestris (Greene) P.H.Raven (Mojave suncup)
- Camissonia contorta (Douglas) Kearney
- Camissonia dentata(Cav.) Reiche
- Camissonia dominguez-escalantorum N.D.Atwood, L.C.Higgins & S.L.Welsh
- Camissonia graciliflora (Hook. & Arn.) P.H.Raven
- Camissonia hilgardii (Greene) P.H.Raven
- Camissonia integrifolia P.H.Raven
- Camissonia kernensis (Munz) P.H.Raven
- Camissonia lacustris P.H.Raven
- Camissonia ovata (Nutt. ex Torr. & A.Gray) P.H.Raven
- Camissonia palmeri (S.Watson) P.H.Raven
- Camissonia parvula (Nutt.) P.H.Raven
- Camissonia pubens (S.Watson) P.H.Raven
- Camissonia pusilla P.H.Raven
- Camissonia sierrae P.H.Raven
- Camissonia strigulosa (Fisch. & C.A.Mey.) P.H.Raven
- Camissonia subacaulis (Pursh) P.H.Raven
- Camissonia tanacetifolia (Torr. & A.Gray) P.H.Raven
