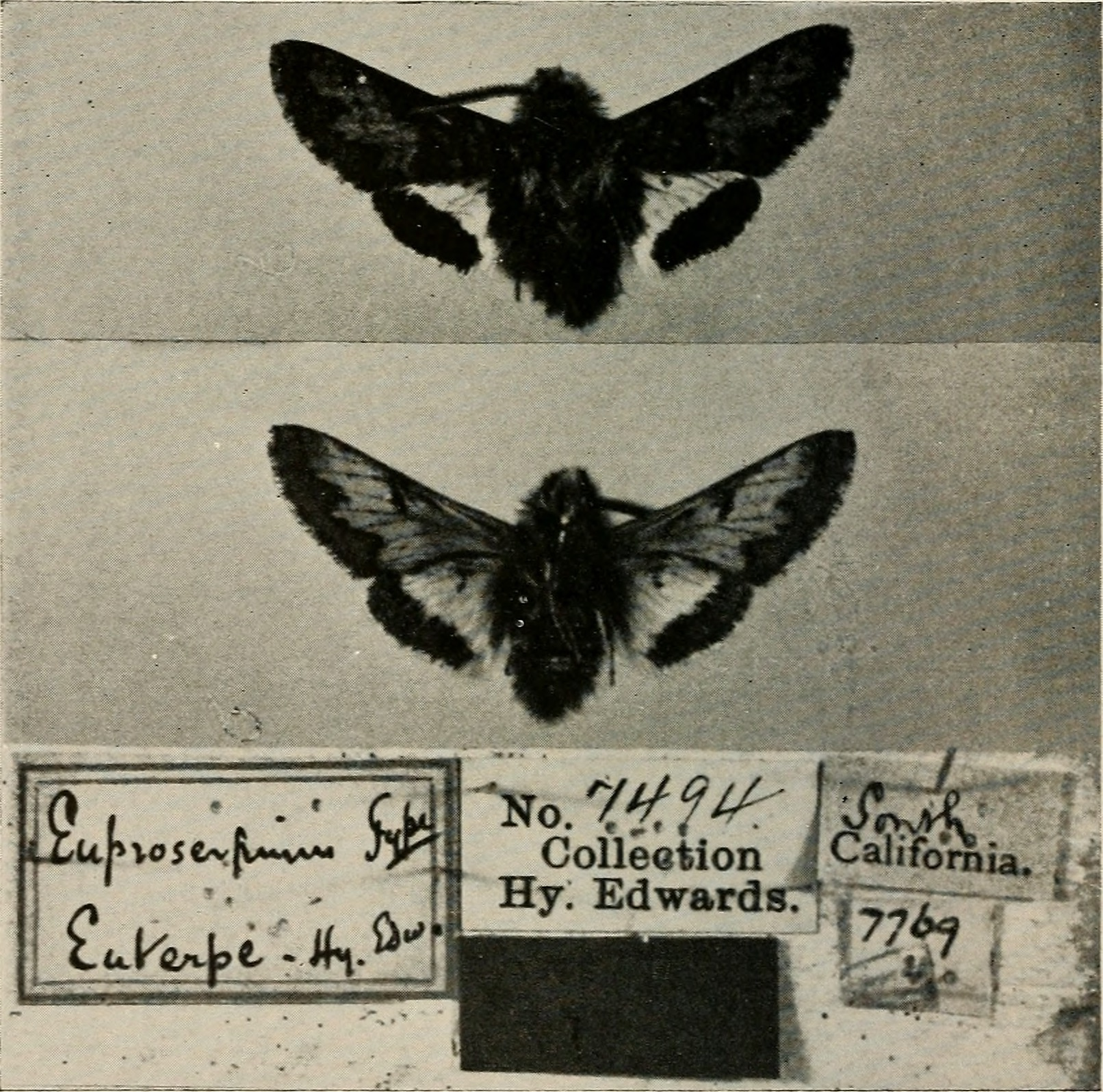

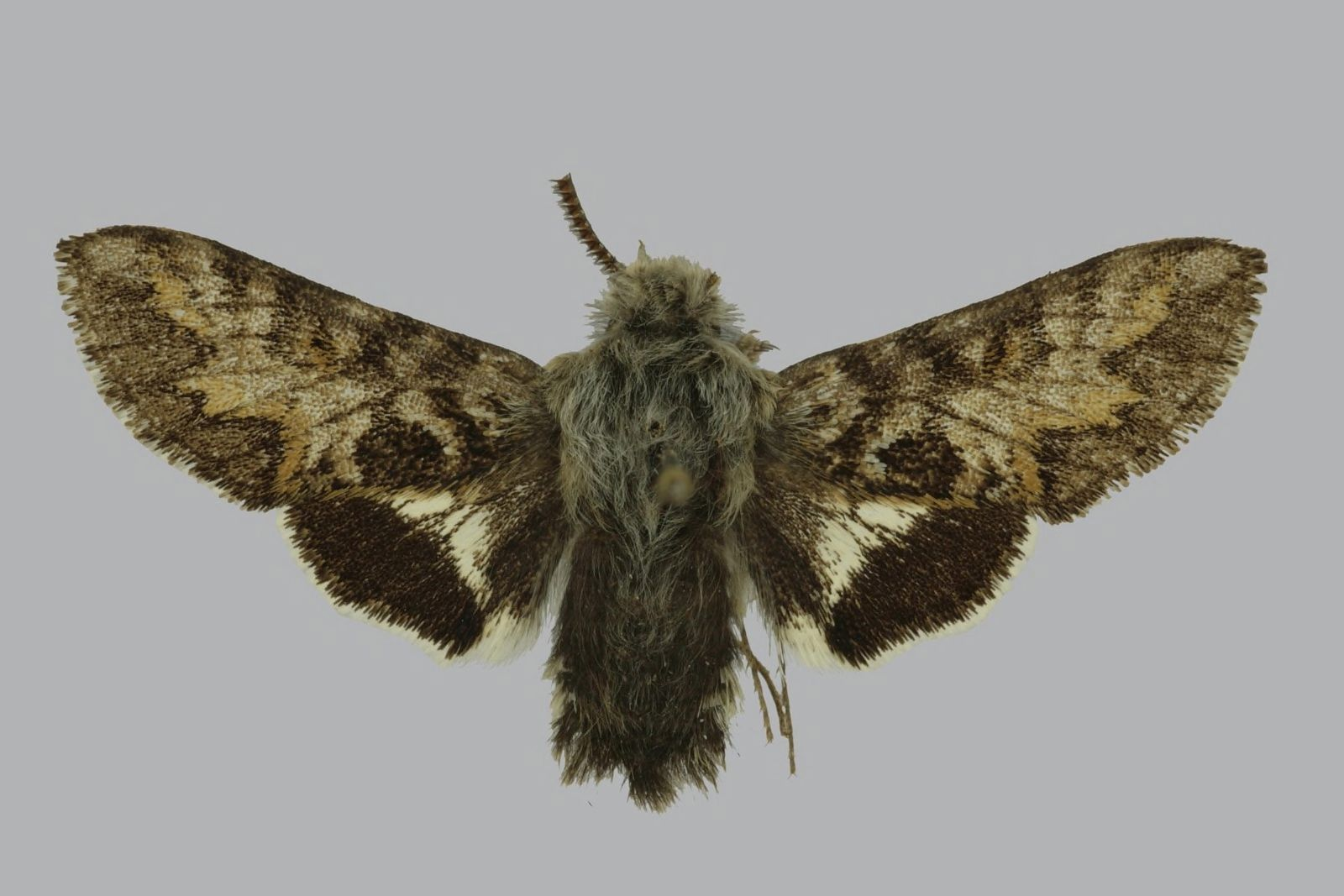

Conservation status
- Threatened (ESA)

Scientific classification
- Kingdom: Animalia
- Phylum: Arthropoda
- Class: Insecta
- Order: Lepidoptera
- Family: Sphingidae
- Genus: Euproserpinus
- Species: E. euterpe

Binomial name
- Euproserpinus euterpe Henry Edwards, 1888

= Euproserpinus euterpe =

Kern primrose sphinx moth

Species of moth

Euproserpinus euterpe, the Kern primrose sphinx moth or euterpe sphinx moth is a small day-flying moth in the family Sphingidae (sphinx moths). The 0.04-inch (1.0 mm), light green eggs are laid haphazardly on various plants in the vicinity of the evening primrose host plants (Camissonia contorta epilobiodes or Camissonia campestris). Larvae emerge from the eggs about a week after oviposition and begin to feed on the flowers and young leaves of the evening primrose. Larvae hatching from eggs laid on other plants are able to wander significant distances to find the host plant.

First-instar larvae (caterpillar phases) are green with dark brown to black heads, legs, lateral spiracles, thoracic shields, and blunt anal horns. Second- and third-instar larvae are green and red, with red heads, thoracic shields, and prolegs (leg-like appendages that are not true legs). Fourth- and fifth-instar larvae (i.e. caterpillars that have shed their skin three or four times) have red to dark red heads, with green and rust-red bodies accented with black areas around spiracles, anal shield and anal horn. The legs are green and the prolegs are red in these mature larvae. Adult moths have a gray ground color with patterned black and brown markings on the forewings. Hindwings are off white with black marginal banding. Males are slightly smaller than the females and are difficult to distinguish, except by close examination of the antennae. These are small sphinx moths with a wing span of a bit more than an inch (25 mm) from tip to tip.

Adults nectar on a variety of flowering species that occur in the region, including, filaree (Erodium species), goldfields (Lasthenia gracilis), and baby blue eyes (Nemophila menziesii). The adult's flight season occurs from mid-January to the first week of April, with a peak period in mid-February through mid-March. The timing may vary according to the climatic conditions in the region.

== Distribution ==
Distribution is apparently restricted to two locations in California: a privately owned ranch in the Walker Basin, Kern County and the Carrizo Plain National Monument, San Luis Obispo County. The Walker Basin is an agricultural region, primarily growing cereals and cattle. The moth is found in disturbed areas in association with its larval and adult food plants. More specifically, the moth favors the banks of sandy washes, in which the sand has the proper compaction and moisture content for burrowing larvae. It can apparently also use other disturbed areas including road shoulders and abandoned agricultural fields. The population in the Carrizo Plain National Monument was discovered in 2002 and is being managed by the Bureau of Land Management.

== Conservation status ==
It once was believed that Erodium was a serious threat to the sphinx moth because of larval mortality after eggs were mistakenly deposited on this plant. However, emerging research shows that female moths deposit eggs on plants indiscriminately, and the larvae wander to find a suitable host. Erodium is never fed upon. Until 1974 the species was considered to be extinct, at which time a surviving population was found in the eponymous Kern County. Sphinx moths are valuable to insect collectors, who may pose a threat to these small populations. Pesticide or herbicide application could also endanger the moth. But the greatest threat is likely habitat loss and alteration. This species is extremely rare and in most years field surveys of the Walker Basin population have found few or no individuals. However, desert Lepidoptera often show great natural variations in population size in response to climatic conditions, and surveys may more accurately reflect population status in years with above-normal rainfall.
