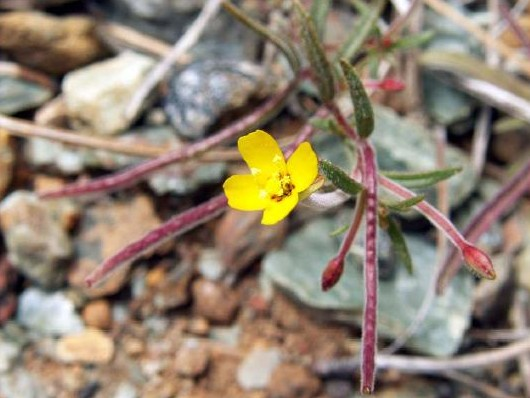

Conservation status
- Threatened (ESA)

Scientific classification
- Kingdom: Plantae
- Clade: Tracheophytes
- Clade: Angiosperms
- Clade: Eudicots
- Clade: Rosids
- Order: Myrtales
- Family: Onagraceae
- Genus: Camissonia
- Species: C. benitensis

Binomial name
- Camissonia benitensis P.H.Raven

= Camissonia benitensis =

Species of flowering plant

Camissonia benitensis is a species of evening primrose known by the common names San Benito suncup and San Benito evening primrose. It is endemic to the Diablo Range of the South Coast Ranges of California, where its range includes far southern San Benito County, far western Fresno County, and far eastern Monterey County.

The species is categorized as a strict serpentine endemic, meaning that it is almost always found growing on serpentine soils; however, at least 10 populations of the species are known to occur on greywacke substrates. Most of the habitat of the species is associated with the New Idria Serpentine Mass, Laguna Mountain Serpentine Mass, Hepsedam Peak Serpentine Mass, Panther Peak Serpentine Mass, Mustang Ridge Serpentine Mass, and numerous smaller serpentine masses between. These masses are surrounded by non-serpentine rocks of the Franciscan Formation, including greywacke which some populations of Camissonia benitensis occur. Serpentine is an ultramafic rock. It weathers to produce soils with characteristically low levels of nutrients like nitrogen, phosphorus, potassium, and calcium, and high levels of magnesium and heavy metals including nickel and chromium. A major, consistent chemical feature of serpentine soil is a bioavailable calcium:magnesium ratio much less than 1. Most nonserpentine soils have a ratio far greater than 1 (more calcium and much less magnesium). The extreme chemical characteristics of serpentine soils give rise to uniquely adapted and rare serpentine endemic plant species such as C. benitensis.

Like Camissonia benitensis, the previously ranked strict serpentine endemic Layia discoidea also has several populations that occur on greywacke and chert outcrops and talus around the New Idria Serpentine Mass. Additionally, the strict serpentine endemic Quercus durata var. durata also occurs on greywacke in the vicinity of Condon Peak adjacent to the New Idria Serpentine Mass. The occurrence of these strict serpentine endemics on graywacke suggests that greywacke has physical and or chemical characteristics similar to serpentine and may serve as a habitat analog.

== Description ==
Camissonia benitensis was discovered by Peter H. Raven on a serpentine stream terrace adjacent to Clear Creek (New Idria serpentine mass; Bureau of Land Management Clear Creek Management Area) in 1960 and scientifically described by him in 1969. The plant's specific epithet, "benitensis", commemorates its discovery in San Benito County. It is a diminutive annual herb that rarely grows larger than 10 centimeters in field conditions, but can become multi-branched and exceed 30 centimeters in diameter within a horticultural setting. Its reddish stems bear plentiful linear leaves less than 1 centimeter long and minutely toothed along the edges. Plants bear four-petaled yellow flowers approximately 6 millimeters in diameter.

Camissonia benitensis seeds at and near the soil surface germinate with the first rains in fall or winter (November 1 - January 31). The plants grow through late fall, winter, and early spring (germination with first rainfall to April) and flowering in April and May. The species is fully self-pollinating. The fruit is a long, cylindrical capsule approximately 2 to 3 centimeters in length that matures May through July, becoming dry at full maturity with plant senescence. The fruits typically either do not open or only open part way near the tip and do not disperse most of the seed at maturity. It has been observed that most fruits fully open and seeds disperse with rain drop impact on the dry fruits - either during infrequent summer rain storms or with the first rains in fall. The seeds are about 1 millimeter long and 0.5 millimeter wide - the size of sand grains. They are black to brown in color and have a smooth seed coat. The seeds have a demonstrated longevity of at least 20 years in the soil seed bank. Long-distance seed dispersal likely occurs as seeds in mud stuck to animals or vehicles.

Camissonia benitensis bears a close resemblance to Camissonia contorta. The two species are virtually indistinguishable with the naked eye when plants are small (under 6 centimeters), as is common in their native habitat, where they occur together. Camissonia strigulosa also grows in this range but is distinguishable by its smaller flowers and prostrate habit. They dichotomous keys in The Jepson Manual first edition are not detailed enough to make certain positive identifications. One key characteristic that can help distinguish the three species is the morphology of the trichomes on the distal inflorescences. C. contorta has trichomes that look like transparent glassy rods. C. strigulosa has white linear or lance-shaped blades. C. benitensis has both kinds of trichomes. This key characteristic was lacking in Jepson Manual first edition, but is now included in Jepson Manual second edition.

A Camissonia which resembles either C. contorta or C. benitensis growing on serpentine soil in upland geologic transition zone habitat or serpentine stream terrace habitat within serpentine masses is virtually always C. benitensis. A Camissonia resembling either of the two species on serpentine stream terraces outside of serpentine masses or mixed alluvium stream terraces could be either C. contorta or C. benitensis. C. strigulosa is the common Camissonia species found growing on nonserpentine alluvial stream and river deposits within the range of C. benitensis.

== Range and habitat ==
Based upon the original discovery of C. benitensis on a serpentine alluvial stream terrace adjacent to Clear Creek, it was long believed that its only habitat type consisted of serpentine alluvial terraces adjacent to perennial streams and rivers, a very rare type of habitat. Until 2010 few populations of the species had been found in any other habitat. In 2010 numerous additional populations were discovered on other land forms including ancient serpentine alluvium deposits (upland hills), serpentine landslides originating from tectonic masses (upland), and serpentine soils on the periphery of large tectonic serpentine (ultramafic) masses (upland)(USFWS 2020). These recently discovered habitat types are collectively called the "geologic transition zone." This habitat type is now known to constitute the majority of the habitat area and contains most of the known populations of the species (USFWS 2020). Populations found near Priest Valley in 2010 extended the previously known range 15 kilometers to the southeast (USFWS 2020).

Common features of the stream terrace are friable serpentine soils that are stable due to very low gradient or no slope and high percentage of coarser substrate particles including sand, gravel, and cobbles. The plant communities in the area include chaparral and woodland with gaps in between where there are microclimates. C. benitensis occurs in these gaps. Typical woody vegetation in the area includes Quercus douglasii (blue oak), Juniperus californica (California juniper), Quercus berberidifolia (scrub oak), Quercus durata (leather oak), Arctostaphylos glauca (bigberry manzanita) and Ceanothus cuneatus (buckbrush). Gaps between the woody vegetation have sparse herbaceous plant cover. C. benitensis is generally a poor competitor with other plant species, both native and exotic. Dense woody vegetation (closed shrub gaps) appears to be detrimental to C. benitensis due to shading effects. Some areas of geologic transition zone habitat have been partially invaded by invasive annual grasses such as Bromus madritensis. These infestations are usually sparse due to the extreme physical and chemical characteristics of the serpentine soils and the low level of tolerance of Bromus madritensis to those soil characteristics. Wildfire generally has a positive effect on C. benitensis by removing native and invasive vegetation. Prescribed fire is utilized by the Bureau of Land Management to control Centaurea solstitialis which once threatened to invade stream terrace habitat occupied by San Benito evening primrose near the confluence of Clear Creek and San Benito River. Some areas of geologic transition zone habitat on private land are grazed by cattle which like wildfire, is beneficial to C. benitensis by removing competing vegetation, particularly invasive annual grasses.

The current known range for Camissonia benitensis is as follows:

- The northern limit is approximately 0.6 airline mile east-northeast of Sampson Peak (Lat. 36.411366, Lon. -120.693837) and approximately 2 miles north-northeast of Hernandez Reservoir near Johnson Canyon (Lat. 36.422851, Lon. -120.852683)
- The southern limit is California State Route 198 (Lat. 36.201109, Lon. -120.734844) between Mustang Ridge and Priest Valley with an estimated actual (true) range being approximately 2.6 miles further southeast (Lat. 36.169849, Lon. -120.710444).
- The eastern limit is the headwaters of White Creek (Lat. 36.298640, Lon. -120.563787) approximately 2.7 miles southwest of Wright Mountain
- The western limit is Coalinga Road (Lat. 36.378507, Lon. -120.908748) approximately 0.7 mile west of the mouth of Lorenzo Vasquez canyon

== Population dynamics ==
C. benitensis plant numbers fluctuate widely from year to year, up to two orders of magnitude, largely independently of total season rainfall and other climate factors including temperature. Cold winters have been documented to result in high seedling mortality due to the effects of soil frost heave (cyclical night freezing - day thawing) in the loose, sandy soil.

C. benitensis evening primrose is well-buffered from extinction by very large soil seed bank 100 - 1000 times that of the number of plants seen with a population in any given year (USFWS 2020). Seed in the soil seed bank has been documented by direct seed longevity test to be viable for at least 20 years and indirectly determined by inferred burial duration (under leaf litter of shrubs) to be viable for up to 105 years. Members of Onagraceae are well-known to have very large, long-lived soil seed banks.

== Conservation ==
The town of New Idria was founded in 1848 with the discovery of cinnabar (mercury ore) within the New Idria serpentine mass (BLM Clear Creek Management Area). Numerous European prospectors and cattle ranchers settled throughout the area thereafter. Historic impacts to San Benito evening primrose have included logging and mining (gravel, magnesite, chromite, cinnabar, and chrysotile asbestos). The relatively level stream terraces were historically favored by settlers for home sites and to stage industrial activities. A proposed mineral withdrawal for the New Idria serpentine mass will greatly limit any future mining in the area.

In more recent decades, the BLM Clear Creek Management Area became a popular motorized off-road vehicle (ORV) recreation area. C. benitensis was federally listed as Threatened in 1985. The primary threat cited by the Fish and Wildlife Service was off-road vehicle impacts to habitat. At the time, only nine populations of the species were known with most occurring on serpentine alluvial stream terraces within one of the highest ORV use areas at Clear Creek Management Area, Clear Creek Canyon. Nearly all of the stream terrace habitat in Clear Creek Canyon has since been fenced to exclude human impacts. A formal route designation in 2005 has further reduced ORV impacts.

The Clear Creek Management Area was under a temporary Emergency Closure instituted on May 1, 2008 when the Environmental Protection Agency reported that natural occurrences of chrysotile asbestos in the soil was above safe limits for people. Clear Creek Management Area reopened to the public on March 14, 2014 with entry by permit only. Vehicle travel is open only to highway-licensed vehicles on the public touring route that includes Clear Creek Road (R1), Spanish Lake Road (R11), KCAC Road (R5), Sawmill Creek Road - south segment (T158), and San Benito Mountain Peak Road (R13). The main entry points on R1 (at Jade Mill Campground) and R11 (Idria Reservoir) are gated. Individuals may acquire an entry permit for up to 5 days of entry per year. The remainder of the routes formally designated in 2005 remain closed.

== Synopsis ==
Discovery of the geologic transition zone habitat and numerous additional populations has greatly improved the outlook for C. benitensis. Most of the geologic transition zone habitat has not been subject to high levels of human impacts, unlike much of the stream terrace habitat. There are more than 600 known populations of C. benitensis. Only 10 populations were known when the species was federally listed in 1985. 60 populations were known by 2009 with most being within alluvial terrace habitat. 600 populations have since been found since 2010 with most of those being within the newly discovered geologic transition zone habitat. The known range is now several times larger than when the species was Federally listed. Most of the potential geologic transition habitat on both public (BLM and State land) and private land has now been surveyed.

A Federal Register notice from the US Fish and Wildlife Service published on June 1, 2020, proposed to remove Camissonia benitensis from the Federal List of Endangered and Threatened Plants. A final Federal Register notice from the US Fish and Wildlife Service removing the species from the Federal List of Endangered and Threatened Plants was published on February 3, 2022, with an effective date of March 7, 2022.
