= Camissonia pusilla =

Conservation status
- Vulnerable (NatureServe)

Scientific classification
- Kingdom: Plantae
- Clade: Tracheophytes
- Clade: Angiosperms
- Clade: Eudicots
- Clade: Rosids
- Order: Myrtales
- Family: Onagraceae
- Genus: Camissonia
- Species: C. pusilla

Binomial name
- Camissonia pusilla P.H.Raven

Species of flowering plant

Camissonia pusilla is a species of evening primrose known by the common name little wiry suncup. It is native to the western United States from California to Idaho, where it grows in sagebrush and other habitat. It is a petite, hairy, glandular annual herb producing very slender erect stems up to about 22 centimeters in maximum height. The leaves linear with toothed edges and 1 to 3 centimeters long. The nodding inflorescence produces flowers with yellow petals 2 or 3 millimeters long and usually spotted with red near the bases. The fruit is a straight or coiling capsule up to 3 centimeters long.
