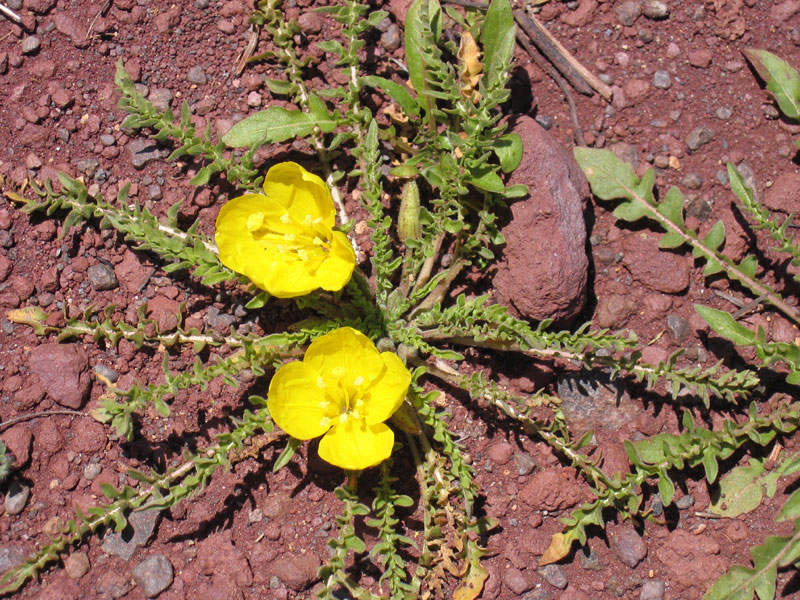
- Taraxia tanacetifolia

Scientific classification
- Kingdom: Plantae
- Clade: Tracheophytes
- Clade: Angiosperms
- Clade: Eudicots
- Clade: Rosids
- Order: Myrtales
- Family: Onagraceae
- Subfamily: Onagroideae
- Tribe: Onagreae
- Genus: Taraxia (Nutt. ex Torr. & A.Gray) Raim.

Species
- See text

= Taraxia =

Genus of Onagraceae plants

Taraxia is a small genus of flowering plants in the family Onagraceae, native to western Canada and the western and west-central United States. Nuclear DNA evidence shows that it is sister to a clade containing all genera in the tribe Onagreae except for Oenothera, Eulobus, and Chylismia.

== Species ==
The following species are accepted:

- Taraxia breviflora (Torr. & A.Gray) Nutt. ex Small
- Taraxia ovata (Nutt.) Small
- Taraxia subacaulis (Pursh) Rydb.
- Taraxia tanacetifolia (Torr. & A.Gray) Piper
