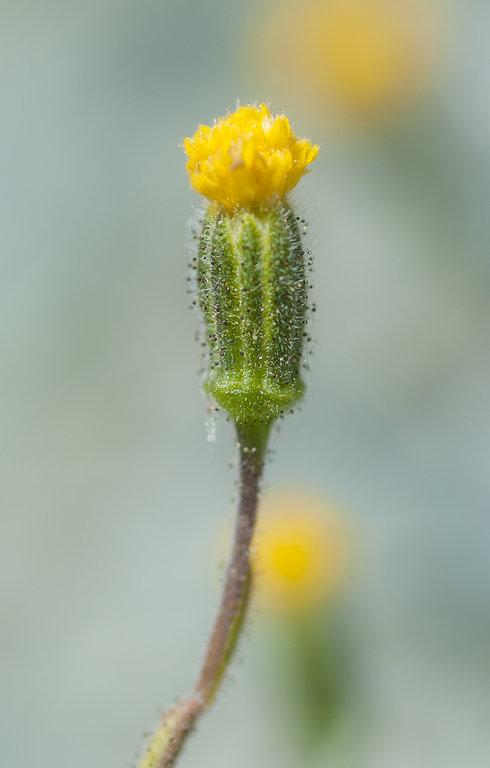

Conservation status
- Imperiled (NatureServe)

Scientific classification
- Kingdom: Plantae
- Clade: Tracheophytes
- Clade: Angiosperms
- Clade: Eudicots
- Clade: Asterids
- Order: Asterales
- Family: Asteraceae
- Genus: Layia
- Species: L. discoidea

Binomial name
- Layia discoidea Keck

= Layia discoidea =

Species of flowering plant

Layia discoidea is a rare species of flowering plant in the family Asteraceae known by the common name rayless tidytips, or rayless layia.

== Distribution ==
Layia discoidea is a local serpentine endemic where it is known only from the Diablo Range in southern San Benito County and far western Fresno County. The known distribution of the species is the New Idria serpentine mass (BLM Clear Creek Management Area) and nearby Laguna Mountain, Hepsedam Peak, and Panther Peak serpentine masses. Layia discoidea is regarded as a strict serpentine endemic with several populations known (as of 2017) to occur on greywacke and chert outcrop and talus at the edge of the New Idria Serpentine Mass near Condon Peak, Sampson Peak, and Idria Reservoir. Typical habitat of the species is serpentine rock outcrop, serpentine talus, and serpentine stream terraces where it grows in full sun with little to no competition from other plant species. The shale and chert outcrop habitat that a few populations of Layia discoidea grows on has similar (analogous) physical and microclimate conditions as the serpentine habitat that the species is primarily found growing.

== Description ==
This is an annual herb growing a small glandular stem to a maximum height of about 20 centimeters. The thin leaves are generally lance-shaped, but the larger leaves on the lower part of the stem are usually lobed. Unlike other Layia species, which are known for their prominent white or yellow ray florets, Layia discoidea has no ray florets or real phyllaries. The flower head is a cluster of many deep yellow disc florets with a base of bractlike scales. The fruit is an achene with a short scaly brown pappus.

=== Speciation ===
Genetic analysis performed on this species suggest that it evolved directly from Layia glandulosa in what may be an example of both allopatric speciation and peripatric speciation. Layia discoidea looks quite different from the white-rayed Layia glandulosa, and it lives in a specialized habitat, but the two species are genetically very similar and produce robust, fertile hybrids when crossed.

Known extant Layia glandulosa populations within the range of Layia discoidea typically have deep yellow ray florets.

Individuals of Layia discoidea occasionally display ray florets that are light yellow in color. Individuals bearing ray florets have been observed in populations at the New Idria, Laguna Mountain, and Panther Peak serpentine masses. It is unclear if the ray florets are a result of hybridization with nearby Layia glandulosa, a genetic mutation, or simply induced by environmental conditions.
