= Camissonia breviflora =

Scientific classification
- Kingdom: Plantae
- Clade: Tracheophytes
- Clade: Angiosperms
- Clade: Eudicots
- Clade: Rosids
- Order: Myrtales
- Family: Onagraceae
- Genus: Camissonia
- Species: C. breviflora

Binomial name
- Camissonia breviflora (Torr. & A.Gray) P.H.Raven

Species of flowering plant

Camissonia breviflora is a species of evening primrose known by the common name short-flower suncup, first described by John Torrey and Asa Gray. It is part of the genus Camissonia and the family Onagraceae.

In 2014, specimens were sighted in Saskatchewan near Frontier for the first time since 1965.
