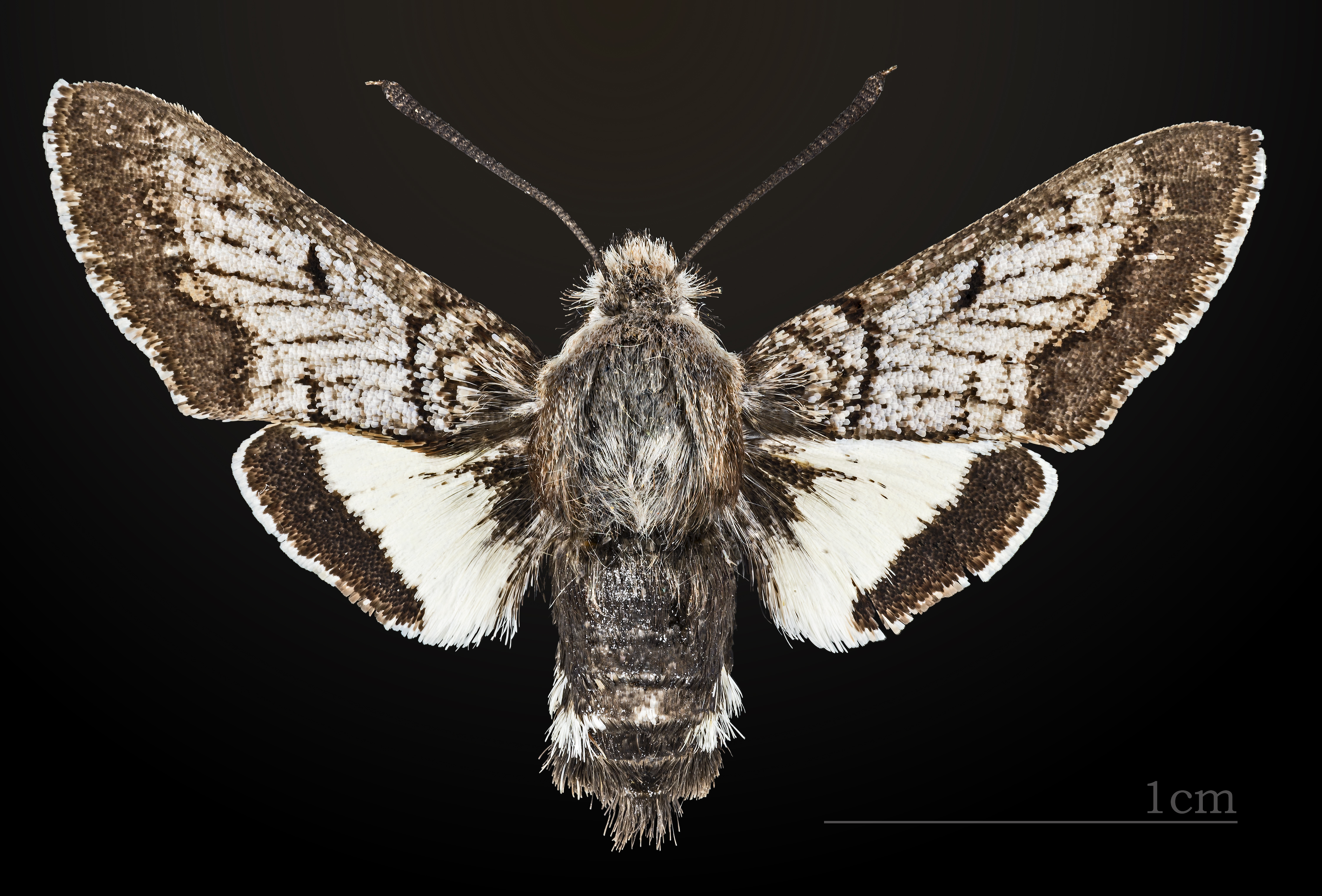
- Dorsal view
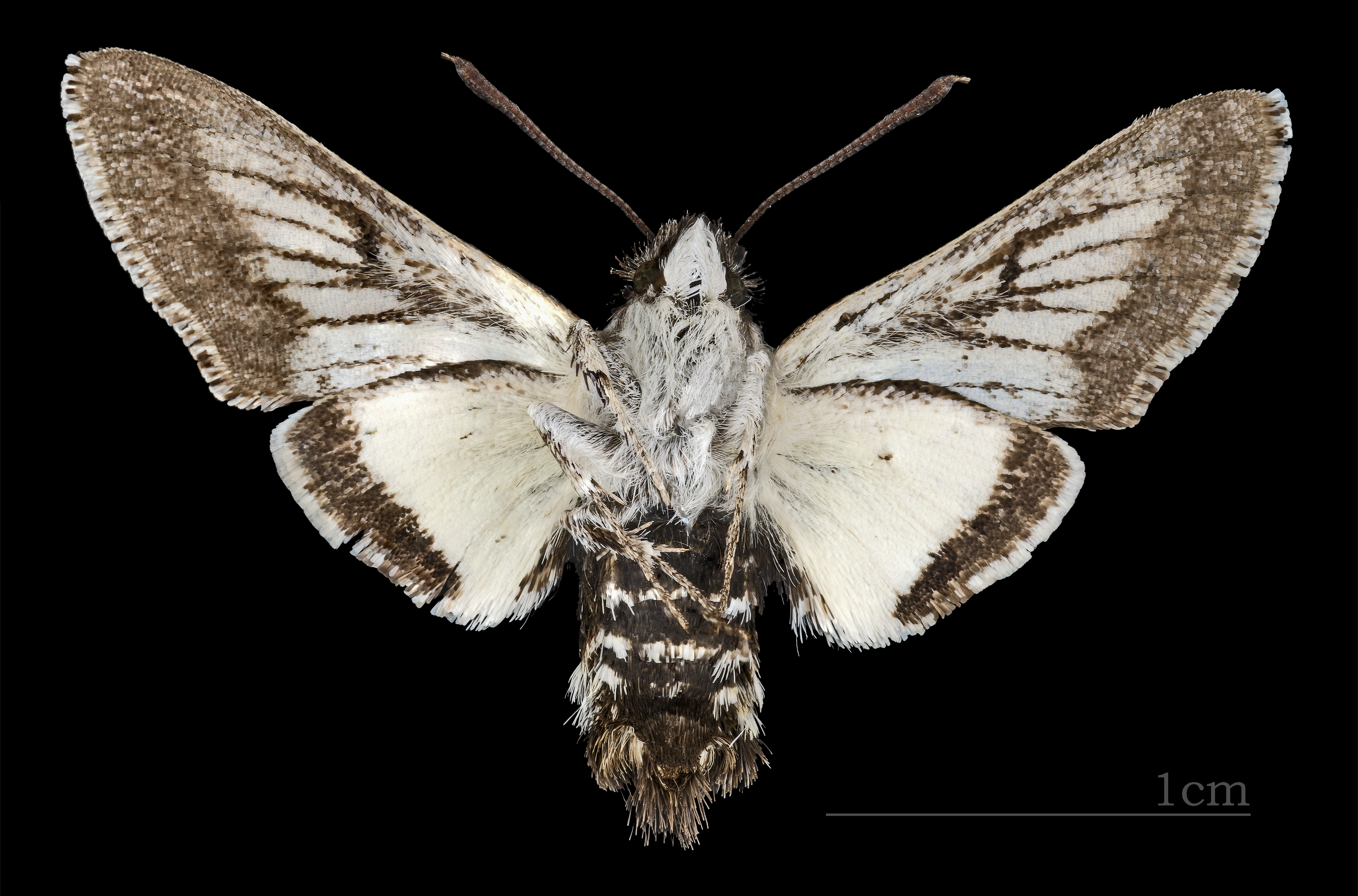
- Ventral view

Scientific classification
- Kingdom: Animalia
- Phylum: Arthropoda
- Class: Insecta
- Order: Lepidoptera
- Family: Sphingidae
- Genus: Euproserpinus
- Species: E. phaeton

Binomial name
- Euproserpinus phaeton Grote & Robinson, 1865

Synonyms
- Macroglossa erato Boisduval, 1868; Euproserpinus phaeton mojave Comstock, 1938

= Euproserpinus phaeton =

Phaeton primrose sphinx moth

Species of moth

Euproserpinus phaeton, the Phaeton primrose sphinx moth, is a moth of the family Sphingidae. the species was first described by Augustus Radcliffe Grote and Herbert C. Robinson in 1865. It is found in North America from California south to Baja California Sur and further into Mexico. It has also been reported in south-western Arizona.

The length of the forewings is 32–42 mm. The abdomen upperside has creamy white side-tufts and a discontinuous dorsal white band. The forewing upperside has a median area which is mainly lacking transverse lines. The hindwing upperside has a straight marginal black band with some black scales. The hindwing underside is lacking black basally.

Adults fly swiftly and close to the ground over dry washes and flat areas in deserts. There is one generation with adults on wing from February to April. Adults nectar at flowers during the day.

The larvae feed on various Onagraceae species.
