= Camissonia lacustris =

Conservation status
- Imperiled (NatureServe)

Scientific classification
- Kingdom: Plantae
- Clade: Tracheophytes
- Clade: Angiosperms
- Clade: Eudicots
- Clade: Rosids
- Order: Myrtales
- Family: Onagraceae
- Genus: Camissonia
- Species: C. lacustris

Binomial name
- Camissonia lacustris P.H.Raven

Species of flowering plant

Camissonia lacustris is a flowering plant species commonly called grassland suncup. It is an evening primrose endemic to California, where it grows in serpentine grasslands near Lakeport in Lake County, California. This is the type locality of the species.

It is an annual herb producing an erect or spreading, sometimes bending or twisting, hairy stem approaching half a meter in maximum length. The leaves grow along the stem and are less than 4 centimeters long and linear or narrowly oval in shape. The nodding inflorescence produces flowers with yellow petals about half a centimeter in length. The petals sometimes have two red dots at their bases. The fruit is a straight wavy capsule which may be several centimeters long.
