= San Benito Mountain =

Mountain in California, United States

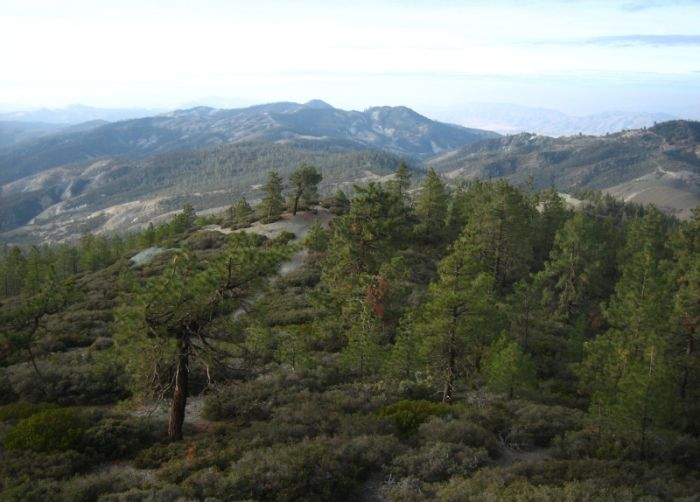
- View from San Benito Mountain

Highest point
- Elevation: 5,267 ft (1,605 m) NAVD 88
- Prominence: 3,481 ft (1,061 m)
- Listing: California county high points 38th
- Coordinates: 36°22′10″N 120°38′41″W

Geography
- Location within California
- Location: San Benito County, California, U.S.
- Parent range: Diablo Range
- Topo map: USGS San Benito Mountain

San Benito Mountain is the highest mountain in the Diablo Range of California. The summit is at an elevation of 5,267 feet (1,605 m). The rock is composed of asbestos (chrysotile), an ultramafic rock. It weathers to produce serpentine soils with characteristically low levels of nutrients like nitrogen, phosphorus, potassium, and calcium, and high levels of magnesium and heavy metals including nickel and chromium. This means little vegetation grows in the area though there are some plants that only grow on such soils like the local endemic San Benito evening primrose. The Clear Creek Management Area includes the San Benito Mountain Research Natural Area, recognized for its unique pine and incense cedar sky island forest assemblage. The Mediterranean climate is punctuated by cool, wet winters and hot, dry summers.

There are two superfund sites in the area, both associated with the mining and processing of chrysotile asbestos. There are also a handful of small mines producing gems and the minerals, but the Clear Creek Serpentine Area of Critical Environmental Concern was withdrawn from mineral entry on August 7, 2012.

== Geology ==
The mountain, which rises to an elevation of 5,267 feet (1,605 m), is the highest point in San Benito County and the Diablo Range. The mountain gets some snowfall during winter. The rock is a chrysotile serpentine, a soft fibrous silicate material. Extreme shearing of the bedrock, combined with soil nutrient imbalances, has resulted in extensive areas of natural barrens completely devoid of vegetation. The serpentine soils harbor several rare, endemic plant species, including San Benito evening primrose (Camissonia benitensis), rayless layia (Layia discoidea), Guirado's goldenrod (Solidago guiradonis), and San Benito fritillary (Fritillaria viridea). A unique pine and incense cedar forest occurs at the highest elevations of the mountain and in 1980, the San Benito Mountain Research Natural Area was designated an Instant Wilderness Study Area.

The serpentine mass contains two superfund sites, Atlas Asbestos Mine and Johns-Mansville. Both were associated with the mining and processing of chrysotile asbestos. Other minerals mined from the serpentine mass included cinnabar, chromite, magnesite, and jadeite. The Gem Mine (private) located within the serpentine mass is the only source of gem-grade benitoite in the world. The rare minerals neptunite and joaquinite have also been found there.

== Health and Safety Restrictions ==
The Clear Creek Management Area, which encompasses the San Benito Mountain Research Natural Area, was temporarily closed by the BLM from May 2008 to February 2014 due to concerns of visitor exposure to naturally occurring asbestos (chrysotile). The core area of the Clear Creek Management Area (approximately 35,000 acres) is the New Idria serpentine mass. The serpentine is highly sheared/pulverized and contains abundant chrysotile asbestos. Therefore, the U.S. Bureau of Land Management requires visitors to obtain permits to enter the Clear Creek Serpentine Area of Critical Environmental Concern.

Recreational opportunities include hunting, camping, hobby gem/mineral collecting, mountain biking, horseback riding, hiking/backpacking, and sightseeing. Hobby gem and mineral collectors are drawn to the Clear Creek area, one of the most highly mineralized areas in California, by the presence of over 150 semi-precious minerals and gemstones. Among these are serpentine, jadeite, cinnabar, tremolite, topazite, neptunite, and the extremely rare California state gem, benitoite.

There are two developed campgrounds in the CCMA, Oak Flat and Jade Mill, both with picnic tables, shade structures, fire rings, and pit toilet.

=== Permit and Season Information ===
Permit and Season Information for San Benito Mountain:

- Serpentine Area of Critical Environmental Concern (ACEC) Permit: This free permit allows an individual to access the Serpentine ACEC within the Clear Creek Management Area for the duration of one day. Each person, regardless of age, entering the Serpentine ACEC is required to have a permit in their name and on their person. An individual is allowed a total of five permits per calendar year.
- Vehicle Permit: Vehicles entering the Clear Creek Management Area, including the Condon Peak campground and trailhead, are required to have a Clear Creek Vehicle Permit. The permit is $5 per vehicle and allows the vehicle to enter the Clear Creek Management Area for seven days from the date of entry. Each vehicle must display the permit on its dash while in the Clear Creek Management Area.
- Condon Peak Off-Highway Vehicle (OHV) Permit: Every ATV or Utility Terrain Vehicle (UTV) entering Condon Peak's trail network is required to have a permit. The permit cost is $10 and allows the ATV/UTV driver, age 16 and older, access to the route network at Condon Peak for seven days from the entry date.
