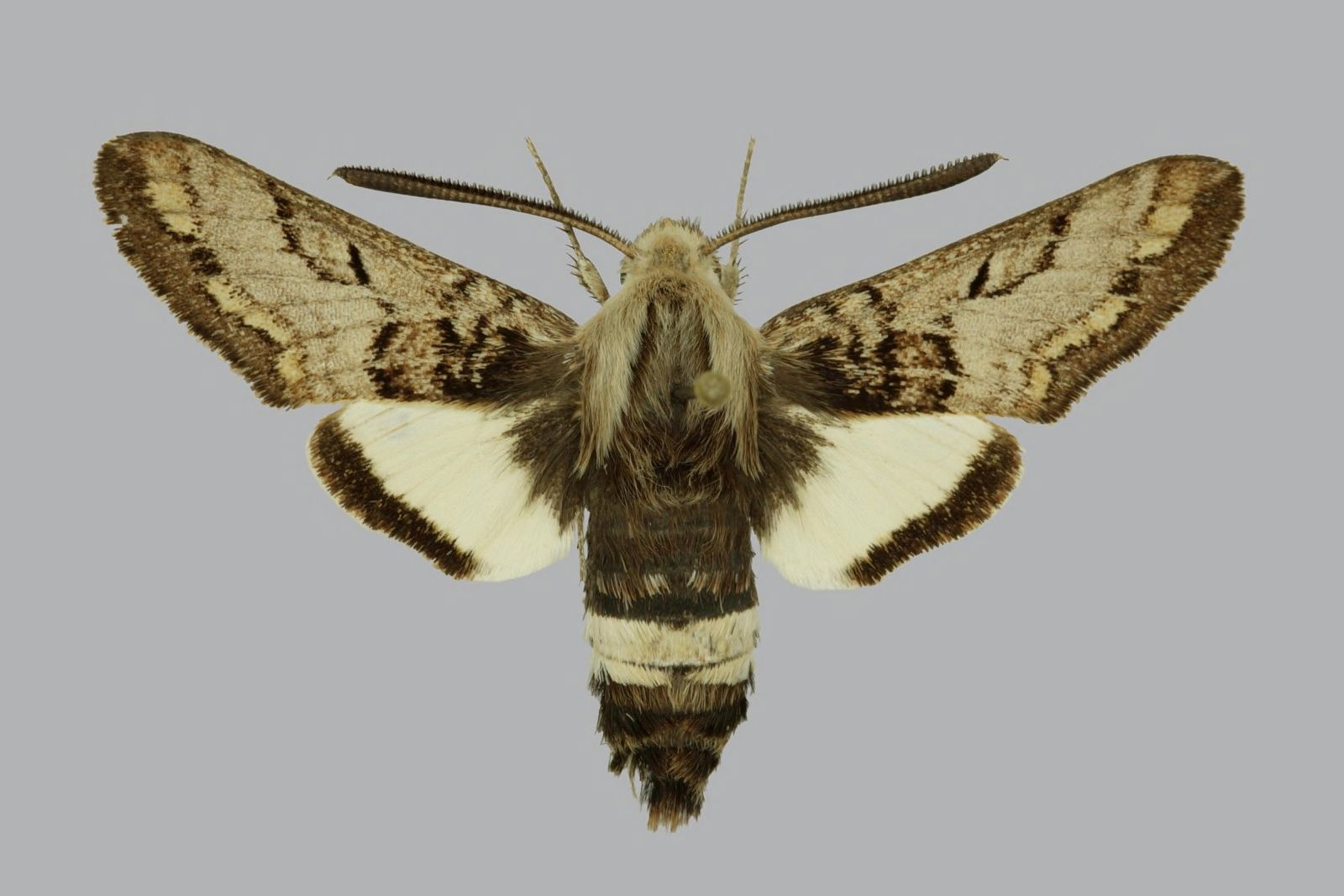

Conservation status
- Critically Endangered (IUCN 2.3)

Scientific classification
- Kingdom: Animalia
- Phylum: Arthropoda
- Class: Insecta
- Order: Lepidoptera
- Family: Sphingidae
- Genus: Euproserpinus
- Species: E. wiesti

Binomial name
- Euproserpinus wiesti Sperry, 1939

= Prairie sphinx moth =

Species of moth

The prairie sphinx moth or Wiest's primrose sphinx (Euproserpinus wiesti) is a species of moth in the family Sphingidae. It is found in the Western United States. The habitat consists of sand washes and prairie blow-outs.

The wingspan is 32–49 mm.

There is one generation per year with adults on wing from May to June. Adults nectar at flowers during the day.

Larvae have been recorded feeding on Oenothera latifolia.

== Sources ==
- World Conservation Monitoring Centre (1996). "Euproserpinus wiesti". IUCN Red List of Threatened Species. 1996 e.T8373A12908327. doi:10.2305/IUCN.UK.1996.RLTS.T8373A12908327.en.
