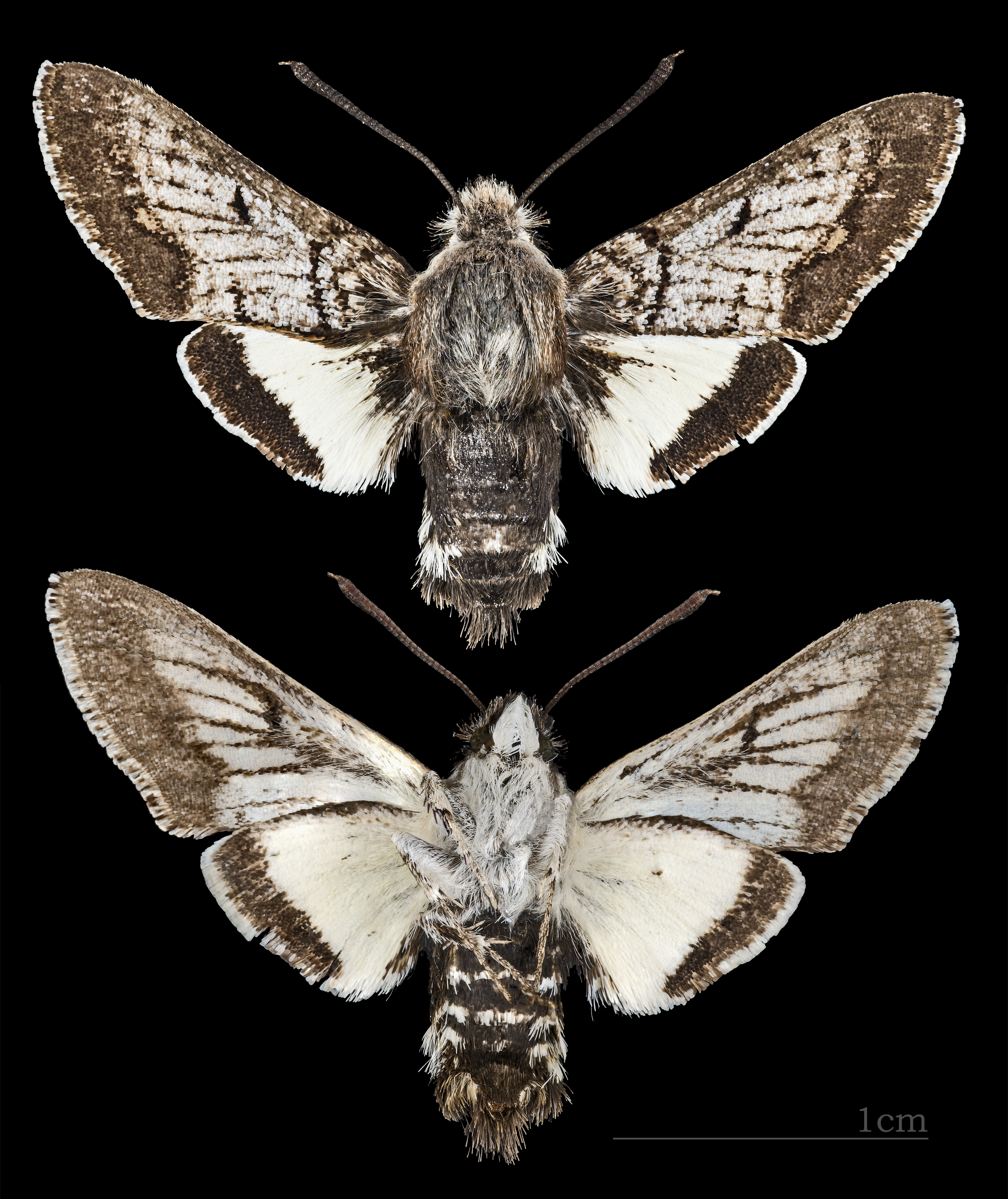
- Euproserpinus phaeton

Scientific classification
- Kingdom: Animalia
- Phylum: Arthropoda
- Class: Insecta
- Order: Lepidoptera
- Family: Sphingidae
- Subtribe: Macroglossina
- Genus: Euproserpinus; Grote & Robinson, 1865

= Euproserpinus =

Genus of moths

Euproserpinus is a genus of sphinx moth in the family Sphingidae. The genus was erected by Augustus Radcliffe Grote and Herbert C. Robinson in 1865.

== Species ==
- Euproserpinus euterpe Edwards, 1888
- Euproserpinus phaeton Grote & Robinson, 1865
- Euproserpinus wiesti Sperry, 1939
