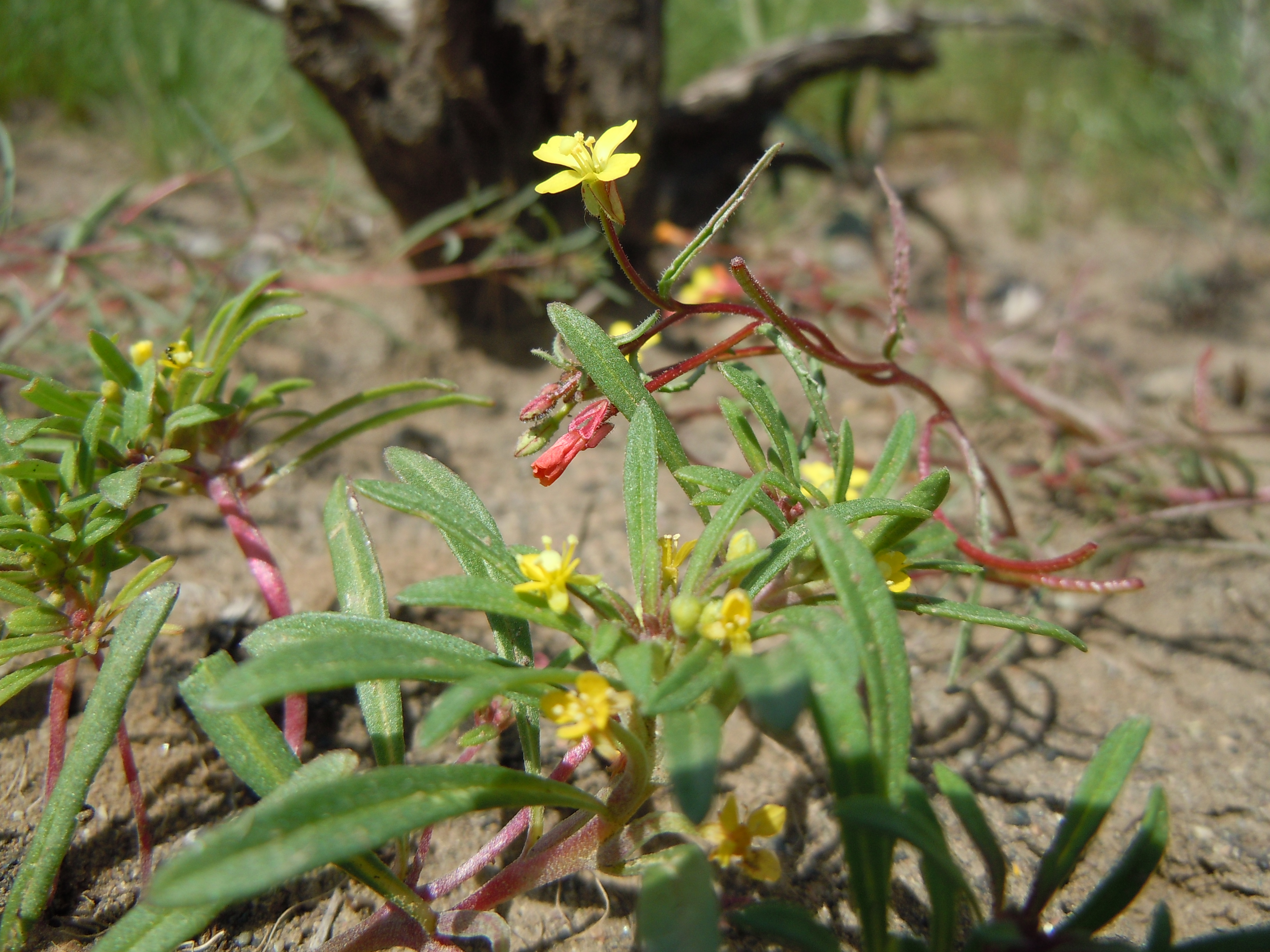

Conservation status
- Secure (NatureServe)

Scientific classification
- Kingdom: Plantae
- Clade: Tracheophytes
- Clade: Angiosperms
- Clade: Eudicots
- Clade: Rosids
- Order: Myrtales
- Family: Onagraceae
- Genus: Camissonia
- Species: C. parvula

Binomial name
- Camissonia parvula (Nutt.) P.H.Raven

Synonyms
- List: Oenothera contorta var. flexuosa (A.Nelson) Munz; Oenothera parvula Nutt.; Sphaerostigma contortum var. flexuosum A.Nelson; Sphaerostigma filiforme A.Nelson; Sphaerostigma flexuosum (A.Nelson) Rydb.; Sphaerostigma parvulum (Nutt.) Walp.

= Camissonia parvula =

Plant species in the evening primrose family

Camissonia parvula is a species of evening primrose known by the common name Lewis River suncup. It is native to the Great Basin of the United States. It grows in sagebrush, woodland, and other Great Basin habitat. It is a slender annual herb producing a wiry erect stem 15 to 30 centimeters in maximum height. The leaves are linear in shape and 1 to 3 centimeters long. They are located along the stem as there is no basal rosette. The nodding inflorescence produces flowers with yellow petals only 2 or 3 millimeters long. The fruit is a capsule 2 to 3 centimeters long, swollen with seeds, and sometimes coiling.
