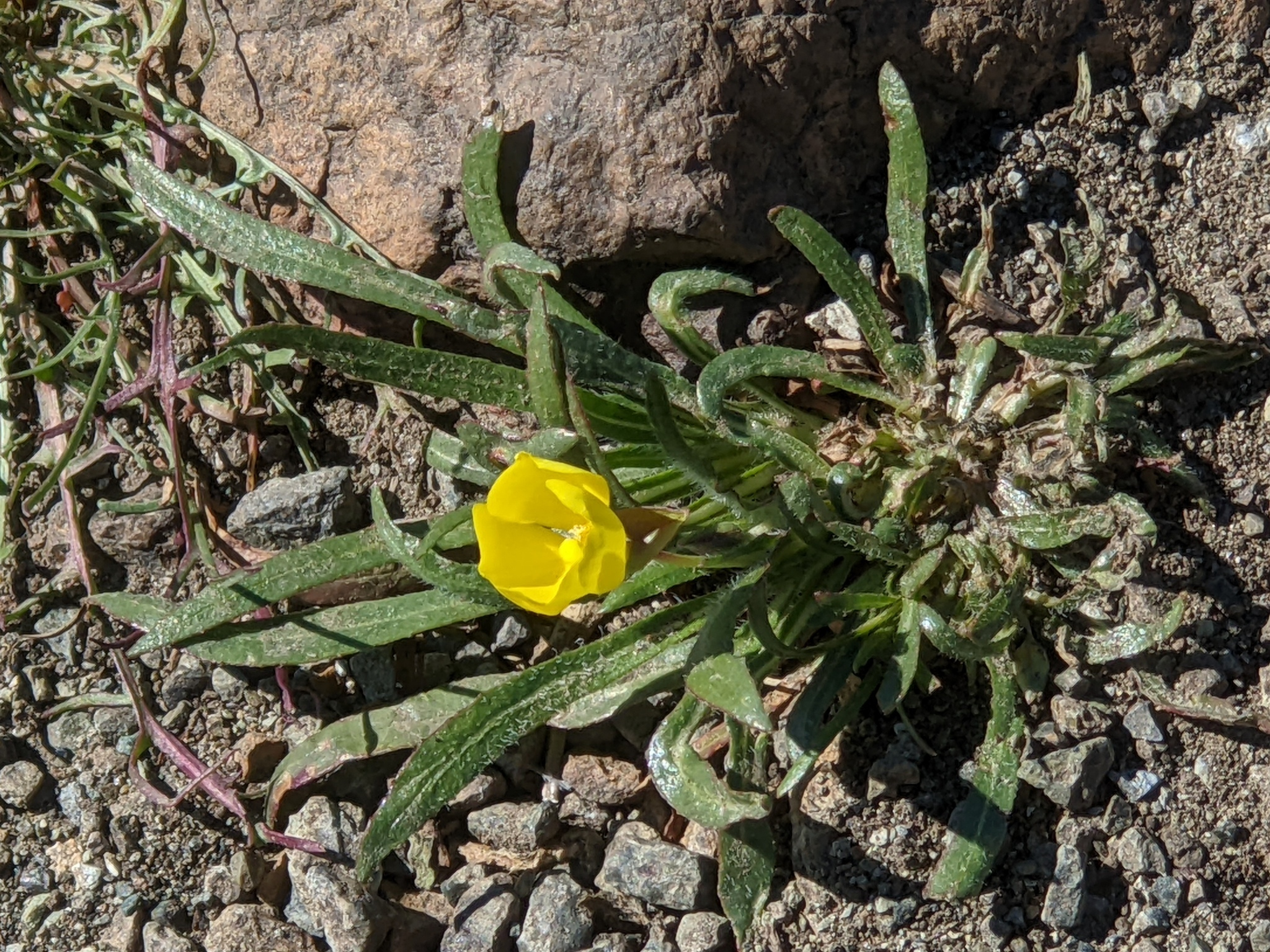
- Tetrapteron graciliflorum

Scientific classification
- Kingdom: Plantae
- Clade: Tracheophytes
- Clade: Angiosperms
- Clade: Eudicots
- Clade: Rosids
- Order: Myrtales
- Family: Onagraceae
- Subfamily: Onagroideae
- Tribe: Onagreae
- Genus: Tetrapteron (Munz) W.L.Wagner

= Tetrapteron =

Genus of flowering plants

Tetrapteron is a genus of flowering plants belonging to the family Onagraceae.

Its native range is Northern America.

Species:

- Tetrapteron graciliflorum (Hook. & Arn.) W.L.Wagner & Hoch
- Tetrapteron palmeri (S.Watson) W.L.Wagner & Hoch
