= Camissonia bairdii =

Conservation status
- Critically Imperiled (NatureServe)

Scientific classification
- Kingdom: Plantae
- Clade: Tracheophytes
- Clade: Angiosperms
- Clade: Eudicots
- Clade: Rosids
- Order: Myrtales
- Family: Onagraceae
- Genus: Camissonia
- Species: C. bairdii

Binomial name
- Camissonia bairdii S.L. Welsh

Species of flowering plant

Camissonia bairdii is a plant species endemic to Washington County, Utah. It occurs in clay soil in pinyon-juniper woodlands. The species is classified as critically imperiled.

Camissonia bairdii is an annual herb up to 12 cm tall, with leaves mostly near the base, with glandular hairs. Leaves are mostly simple (unlobed and untoothed), up to 3 cm long. Flowers are in a short raceme at the ends of the branches, each raceme with up to 7 flowers. Flowers are nodding (hanging), up to 1 cm in diameter, yellow with red spots. Capsule is up to 5 cm long (longer than in most closely related species).
