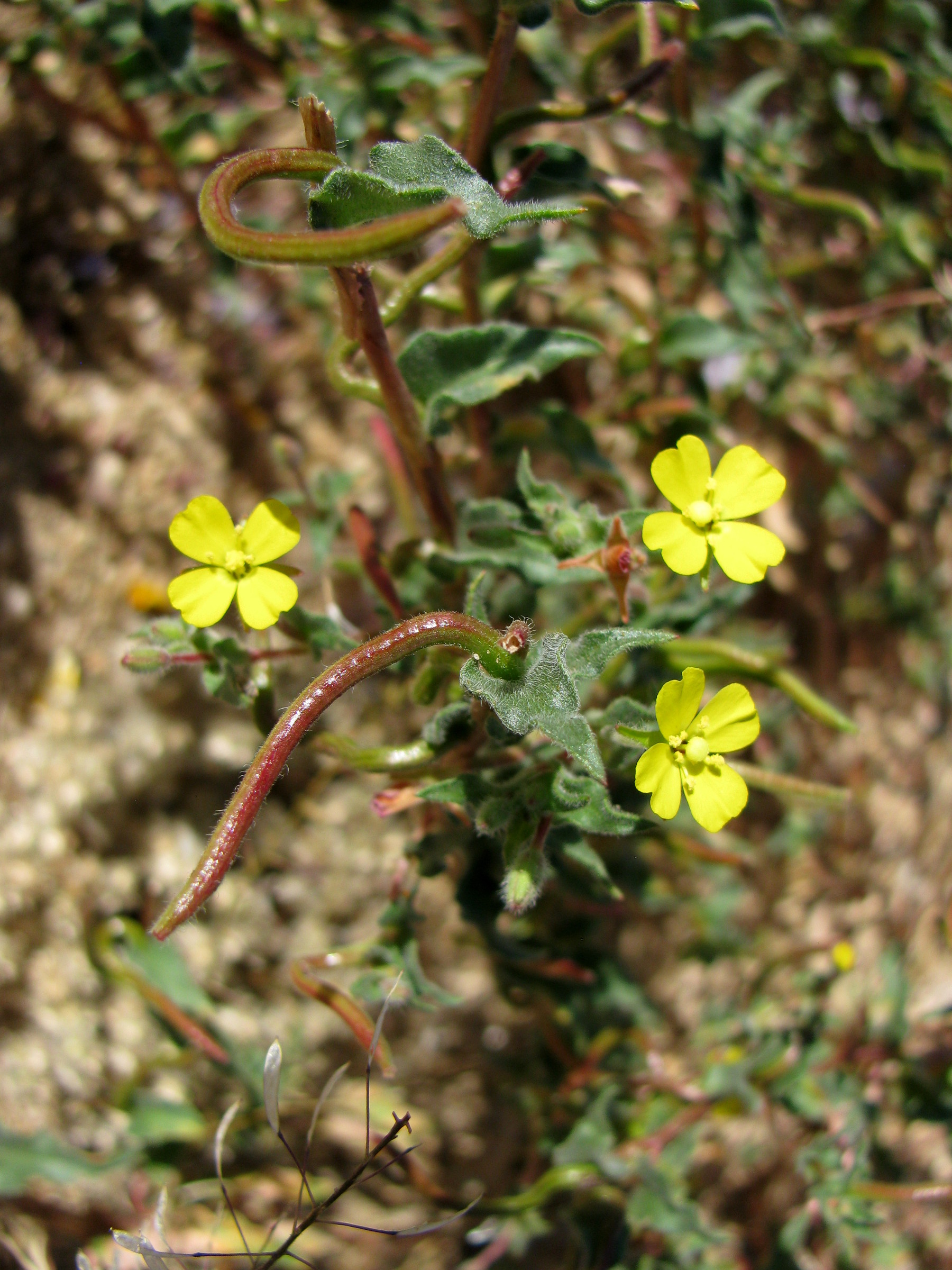

Conservation status
- Vulnerable (NatureServe)

Scientific classification
- Kingdom: Plantae
- Clade: Tracheophytes
- Clade: Angiosperms
- Clade: Eudicots
- Clade: Rosids
- Order: Myrtales
- Family: Onagraceae
- Genus: Camissonia
- Species: C. pubens

Binomial name
- Camissonia pubens (S.Wats.) P.H.Raven

Synonyms
- Oenothera pubens

= Camissonia pubens =

Species of flowering plant

Camissonia pubens is a species of evening primrose known by the common name hairy suncup. It is native to the desert and steppe of western Nevada and eastern California. It is an annual herb covered in glandular hairs generally made up of one or more erect, slender stems up to a third of a meter tall. The leaves are up to about 4 centimeters long and are lance-shaped with wavy, toothed edges. The nodding inflorescence produces flowers with yellow petals each a few millimeters long and sometimes dotted with red near the bases. The fruit is a straight or coiling capsule up to 5 centimeters long.
