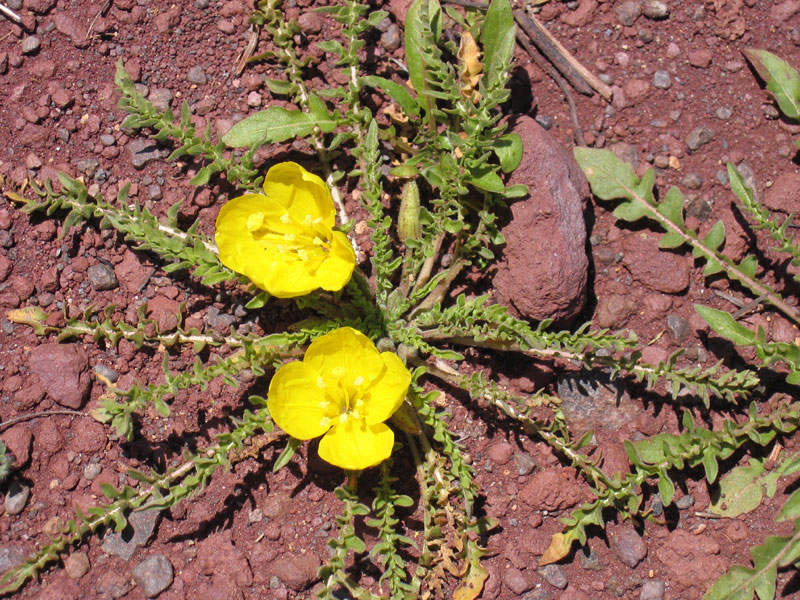

Scientific classification
- Kingdom: Plantae
- Clade: Tracheophytes
- Clade: Angiosperms
- Clade: Eudicots
- Clade: Rosids
- Order: Myrtales
- Family: Onagraceae
- Genus: Taraxia
- Species: T. tanacetifolia

Binomial name
- Taraxia tanacetifolia (Torr. & A.Gray) Piper

Synonyms
- Camissonia tanacetifolia (Torr. & A.Gray) P.H.Raven; Oenothera tanacetifolia Torr. & A.Gray

= Taraxia tanacetifolia =

Species of flowering plant

Taraxia tanacetifolia is a species of evening primrose known by the common name tansyleaf evening primrose. It is native to the western United States, particularly the Great Basin and the mountains of the Pacific Northwest.

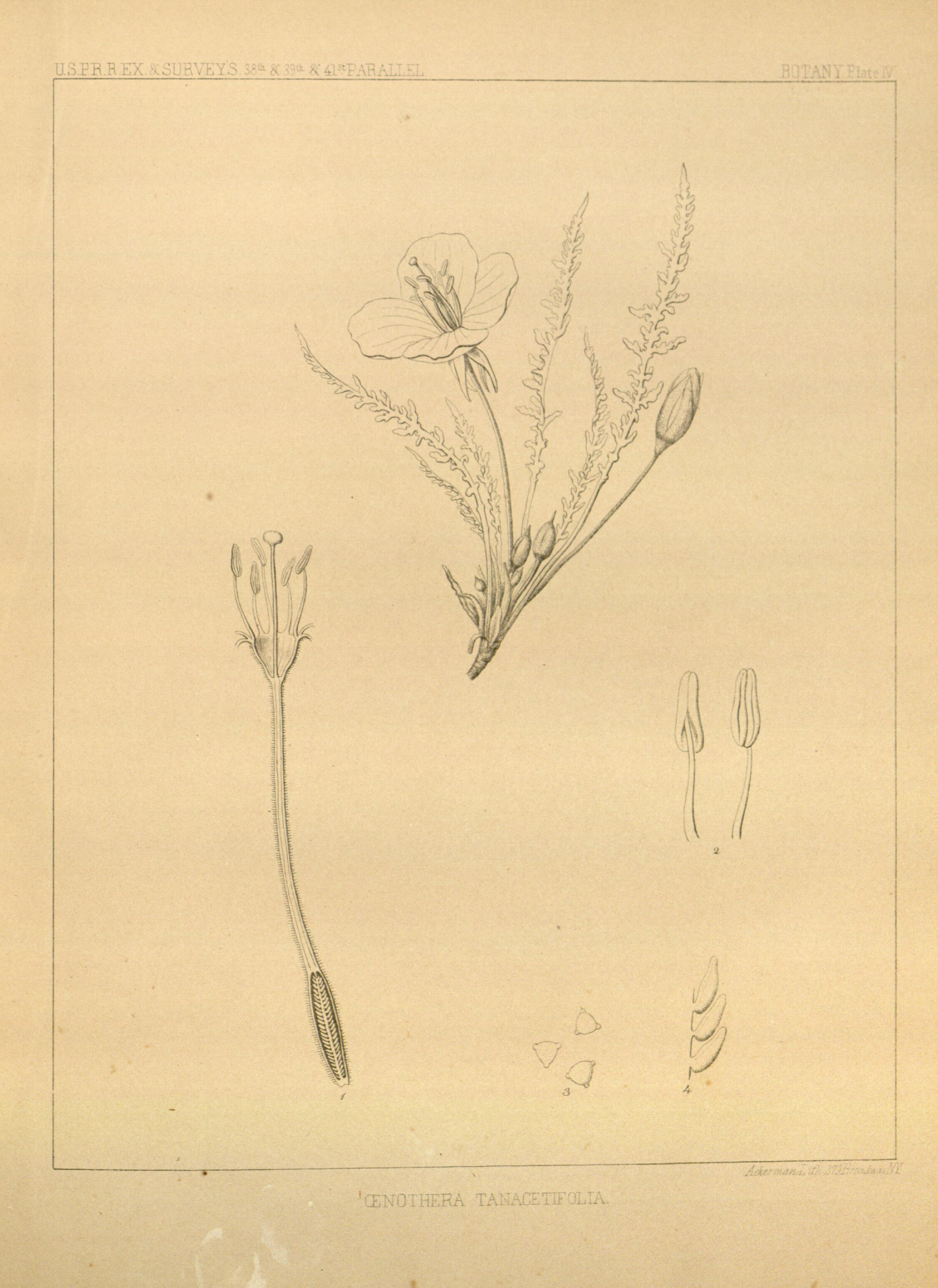
Illustration showing details of the plant.

It is a perennial herb growing from a woody taproot and spreading via lateral shoots. It lacks a stem and takes the form of a flat rosette of hairy leaves with a central inflorescence. The frilly leaves are long and narrow, lined with deep, irregular, narrow lobes. The leaf blades are up to about 30 centimeters long and are borne on long petioles. The flowers at the center of the rosette have bright yellow petals up to about 2.3 centimeters long. The fruit is a swollen, leathery capsule containing two rows of seeds.
