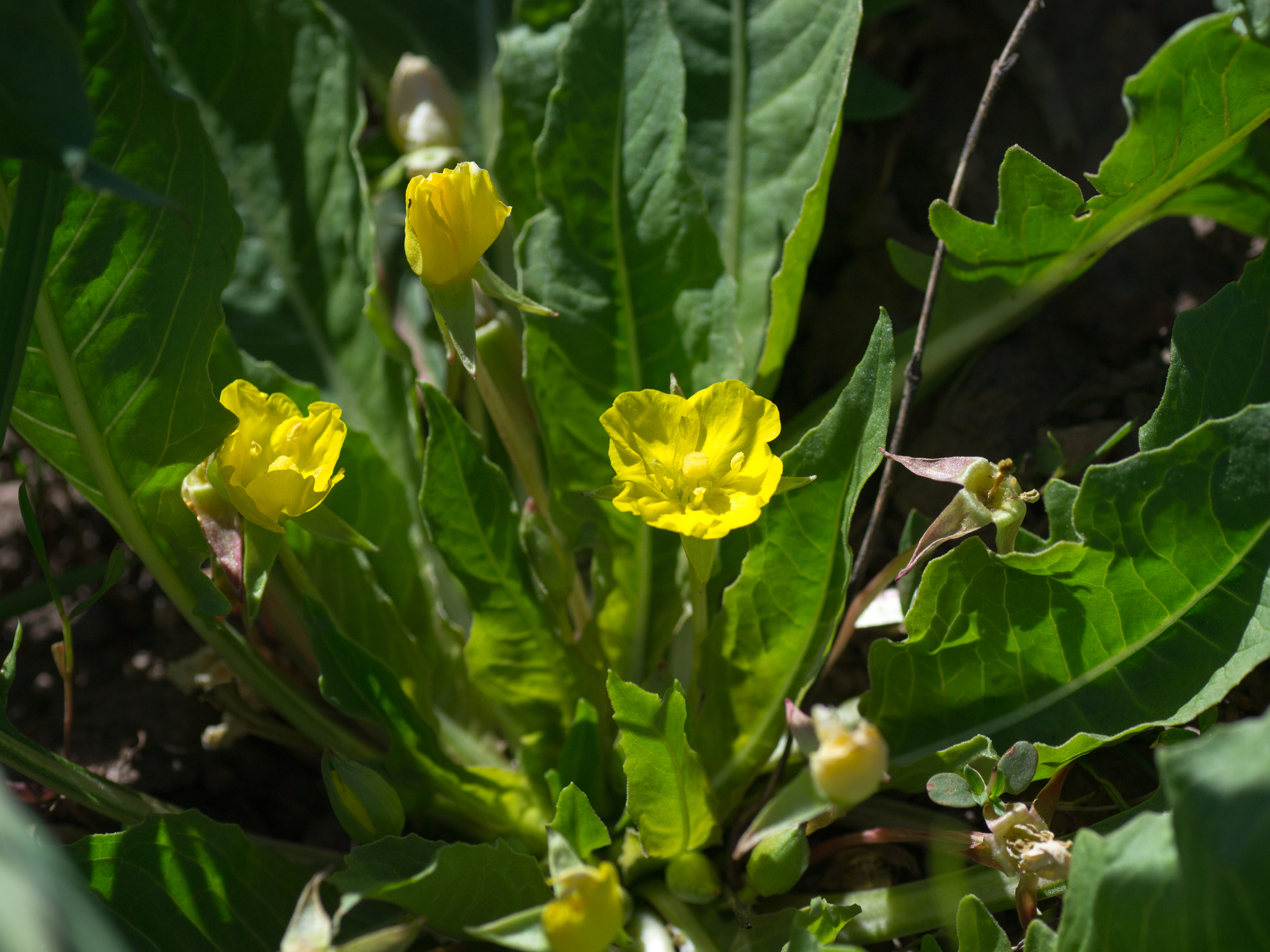

Conservation status
- Secure (NatureServe)

Scientific classification
- Kingdom: Plantae
- Clade: Tracheophytes
- Clade: Angiosperms
- Clade: Eudicots
- Clade: Rosids
- Order: Myrtales
- Family: Onagraceae
- Genus: Taraxia
- Species: T. subacaulis

Binomial name
- Taraxia subacaulis (Pursh) Rydb.

Synonyms
- List: Camissonia subacaulis; Jussiaea subacaulis; Oenothera subacaulis

= Taraxia subacaulis =

Plant species in the evening primrose family

Taraxia subacaulis is a species of evening primrose known by the common name longleaf suncup. It is native to the western United States, where it grows in several habitat types, especially in mountainous areas in moist meadows. It is a fleshy perennial herb growing from a taproot and usually lacking a stem. The leaves are lance-shaped to oval and up to 22 centimeters long and are borne on long petioles. The flower has 4 yellow petals, each up to 1.5 centimeters long, and a large, bulbous stigma tip. The fruit is a leathery capsule 1 to 3 centimeters long.

== Description ==
Longleaf suncup is a perennial plant without stems that grows from a thick taproot. It has a single rosette. The leaves forming the rosette are more or less hairless and also somewhat fleshy in texture. They are lanceolate, shaped like the head of a spear, or narrowly elliptic, the two sides curving. The leaf edges can be smooth or irregularly lobed.

== Taxonomy ==
Taraxia subacaulis was scientifically described and named Jussiaea subacaulis by Frederick Traugott Pursh in 1813. It was moved to the genus Taraxia giving the species its accepted name by Per Axel Rydberg in 1900. It has no accepted varieties, but it has 13 synonyms according to Plants of the World Online including nine species.

Table of Synonyms
Name	Year	Rank	Notes
Camissonia subacaulis (Pursh) P.H.Raven	1964	species	≡ hom.
Jussiaea subacaulis Pursh	1813	species	≡ hom.
Oenothera heterantha Nutt.	1834	species	= het.
Oenothera heterantha var. taraxacifolia S.Watson	1873	variety	= het.
Oenothera primuloidea H.Lév.	1902	species	= het.
Oenothera subacaulis (Pursh) Jeps.	1925	species	≡ hom.
Oenothera subacaulis var. taraxacifolia (S.Watson) Jeps.	1925	variety	= het.
Oenothera taraxacifolia H.Lév. & Guffroy	1902	species	= het., nom. illeg.
Oenothera taraxacifolia var. caulescens H.Lév.	1902	variety	= het.
Oenothera triloba Hook.	1847	species	= het., nom. illeg.
Taraxia heterantha (Nutt.) Small	1896	species	= het.
Taraxia heterantha var. taraxacifolia (S.Watson) Small	1896	variety	= het.
Taraxia taraxacifolia (S.Watson) A.Heller	1900	species	= het.
Notes: ≡ homotypic synonym; = heterotypic synonym

=== Names ===
Taraxia subacaulis is known by the common name longleaf suncup.
