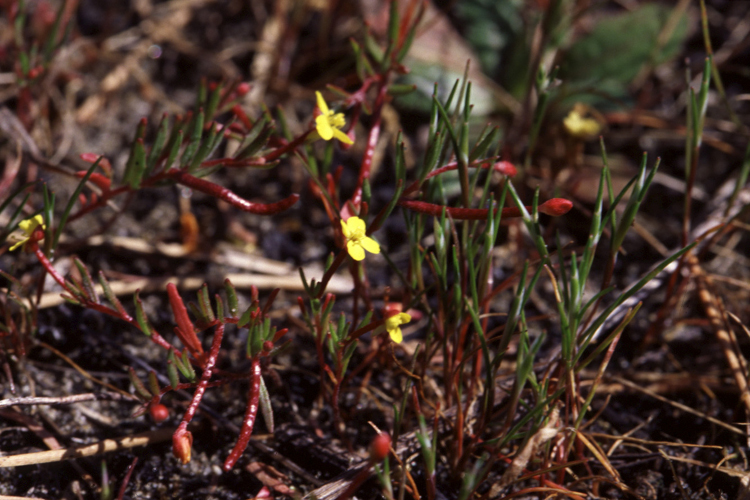

Conservation status
- Apparently Secure (NatureServe)

Scientific classification
- Kingdom: Plantae
- Clade: Tracheophytes
- Clade: Angiosperms
- Clade: Eudicots
- Clade: Rosids
- Order: Myrtales
- Family: Onagraceae
- Genus: Camissonia
- Species: C. strigulosa

Binomial name
- Camissonia strigulosa (Fisch. & C.A.Mey.) P.H.Raven

= Camissonia strigulosa =

Species of flowering plant

Camissonia strigulosa is a species of flowering plant in the evening primrose family known by the common name sandysoil suncup.

The plant is native to California and Baja California, where it grows in sandy areas, such as beaches, mountain sandbars, and the Mojave Desert.

== Description ==
Camissonia strigulosa is an annual herb with a tough, slender, hairy stem which may grow erect or lie along the sand. It approaches 50 centimeters in maximum length and is lined with small, thin green to red linear leaves with tiny bumpy teeth along the edges.

The flower has four yellow petals a few millimeters long which may have red spots near the bases.

The fruit is a long, very thin podlike capsule containing tiny seeds.
