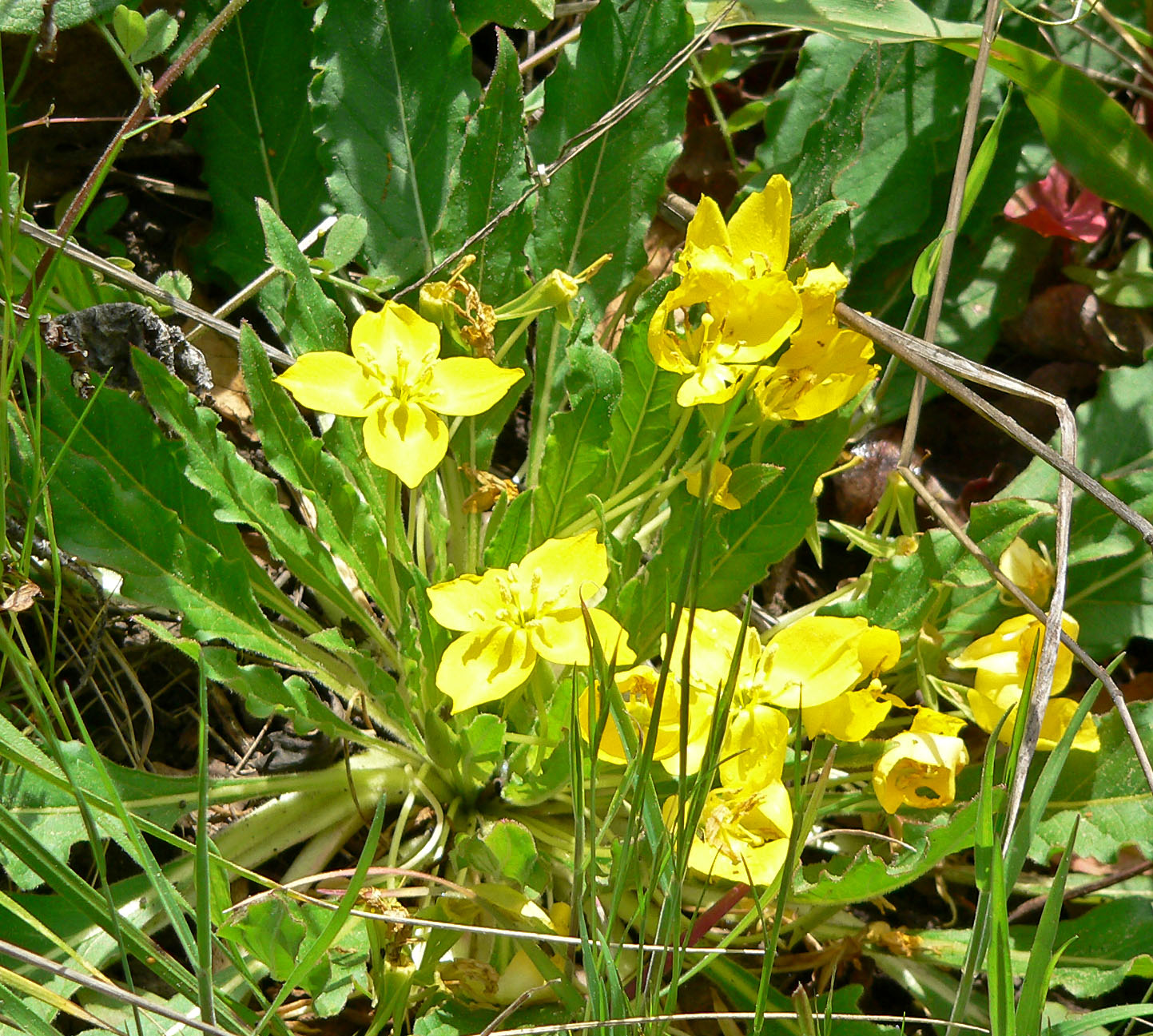

Conservation status
- Vulnerable (NatureServe)

Scientific classification
- Kingdom: Plantae
- Clade: Tracheophytes
- Clade: Angiosperms
- Clade: Eudicots
- Clade: Rosids
- Order: Myrtales
- Family: Onagraceae
- Genus: Taraxia
- Species: T. ovata

Binomial name
- Taraxia ovata (Nutt.) Small

Synonyms
- Camissonia ovata (Nutt.) P.H.Raven; Oenothera ovata Nutt.

= Taraxia ovata =

Species of flowering plant

Taraxia ovata is a species of wildflower native to California and Oregon known by the common name goldeneggs or sun cup.

== Description ==
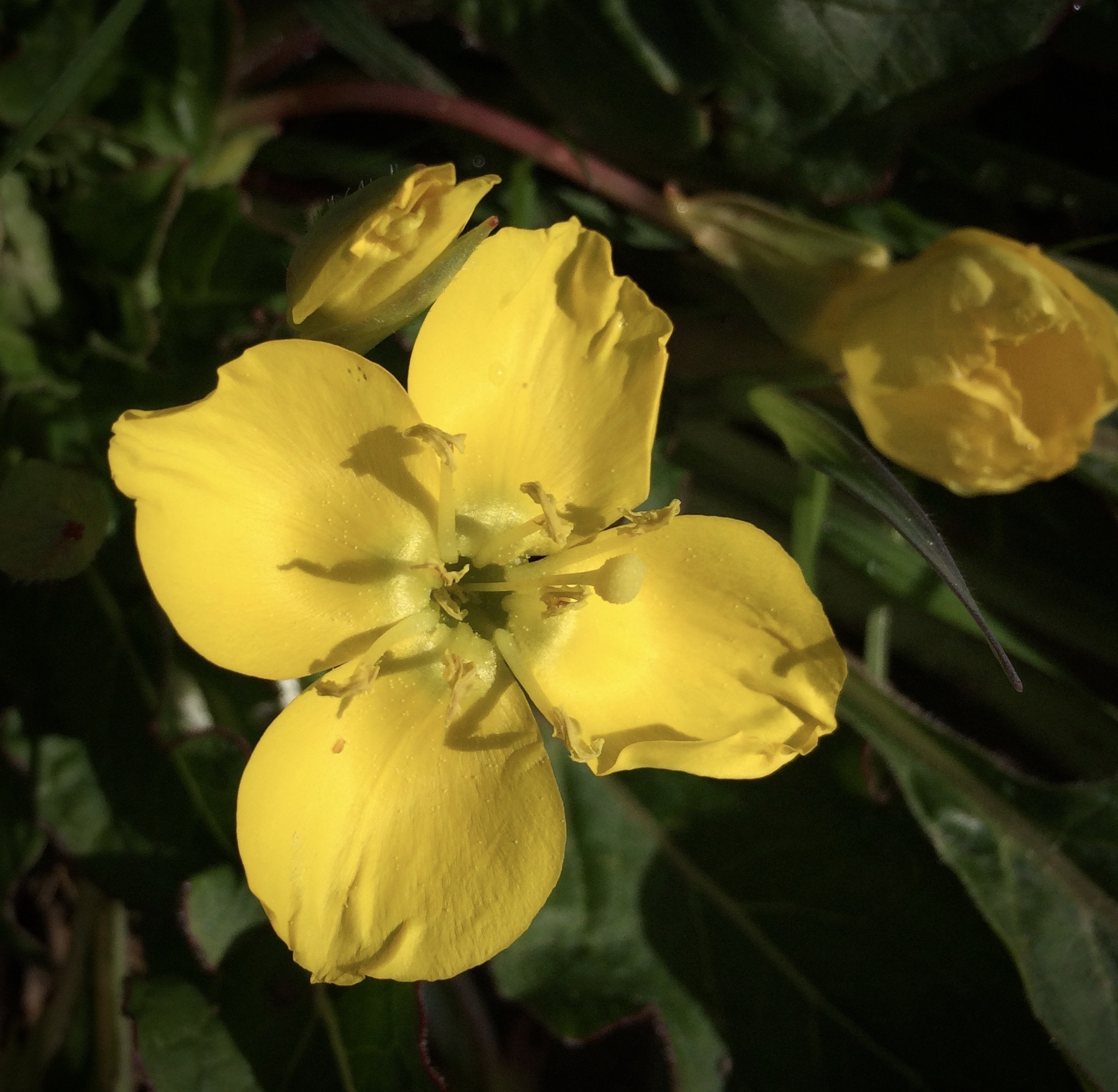
Sun cup Primrose closeup

This is a fleshy, taprooted perennial which often grows in clay soil. It has a wide rosette of long, alternate, feather-shaped or oval leaves which sometimes have wavy edges.

The flowers grow atop thin erect stems and are usually yellow and occasionally white, or yellow with white spots near the bases of the four spoon-shaped petals. The stamens are short compared to Camissonia.

== Distribution ==
Among areas of occurrence are the North Coast Range of California up to elevations of 1600 feet, including Sonoma and Marin County, extending south to San Luis Obispo County.
