= Tetrapteron palmeri =

Conservation status
- Vulnerable (NatureServe)

Scientific classification
- Kingdom: Plantae
- Clade: Tracheophytes
- Clade: Angiosperms
- Clade: Eudicots
- Clade: Rosids
- Order: Myrtales
- Family: Onagraceae
- Genus: Tetrapteron
- Species: T. palmeri

Binomial name
- Tetrapteron palmeri (S.Watson) W.L.Wagner & Hoch

Synonyms
- Camissonia palmeri (S.Watson) P.H.Raven; Oenothera palmeri S.Watson; Taraxia palmeri (S.Watson) Small

Species of flowering plant

Tetrapteron palmeri is a species of evening primrose known by the common name Palmer evening primrose. It is native to the western United States from California to Idaho, where it grows in several habitat types, including desert and sagebrush. It is a roughly hairy annual herb growing in a low patch on the ground, generally with no stem. The leaves are widely lance-shaped and up to about 5 centimeters long, with a few small teeth along the edges. The nodding inflorescence produces flowers with yellow petals only 2 or 3 millimeters long each and a noticeable bulbous stigma tip which may be up to a centimeter wide. The fruit is a leathery capsule around half a centimeter long with small wings near the tip.
