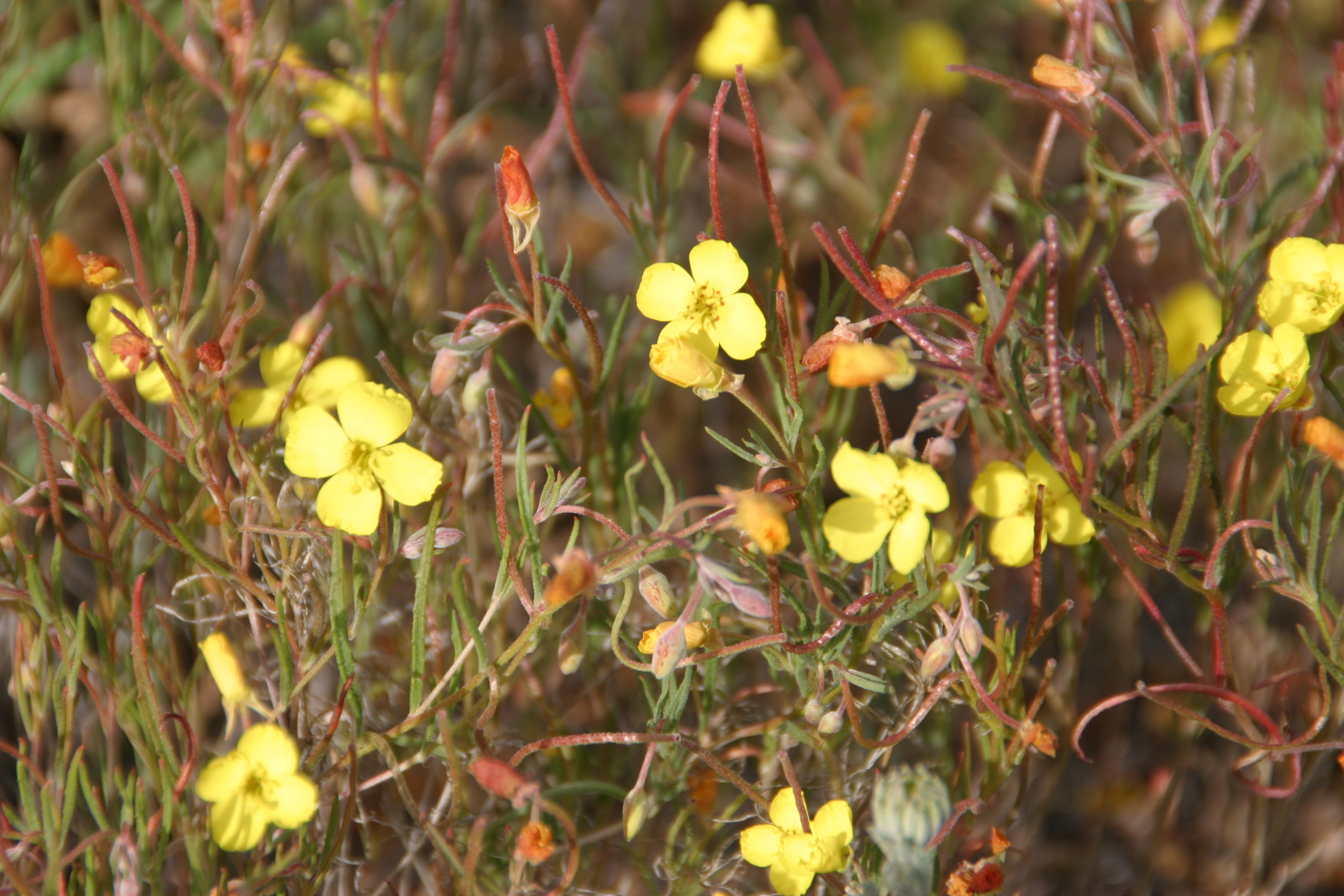
- Camissonia campestris near Gorman, California

Conservation status
- Vulnerable (NatureServe)

Scientific classification
- Kingdom: Plantae
- Clade: Tracheophytes
- Clade: Angiosperms
- Clade: Eudicots
- Clade: Rosids
- Order: Myrtales
- Family: Onagraceae
- Genus: Camissonia
- Species: C. campestris

Binomial name
- Camissonia campestris (Greene) P.H.Raven

= Camissonia campestris =

Species of flowering plant

Camissonia campestris (field primrose, Mojave sun cup, or Mojave suncup), is a flowering plant in the family Onagraceae, native to the Mojave Desert of the United States. It grows mostly on open, sandy flats, occurring from sea level to 2,000 m in the western and central part of the desert.

It is an annual plant growing to 5–25 cm tall (rarely to 50 cm tall). The leaves are linear, 0.5–3 cm long, with a finely serrated margin. The flowers have four petals 5–15 mm long, yellow with a red spot at the base, fading orange to reddish.
