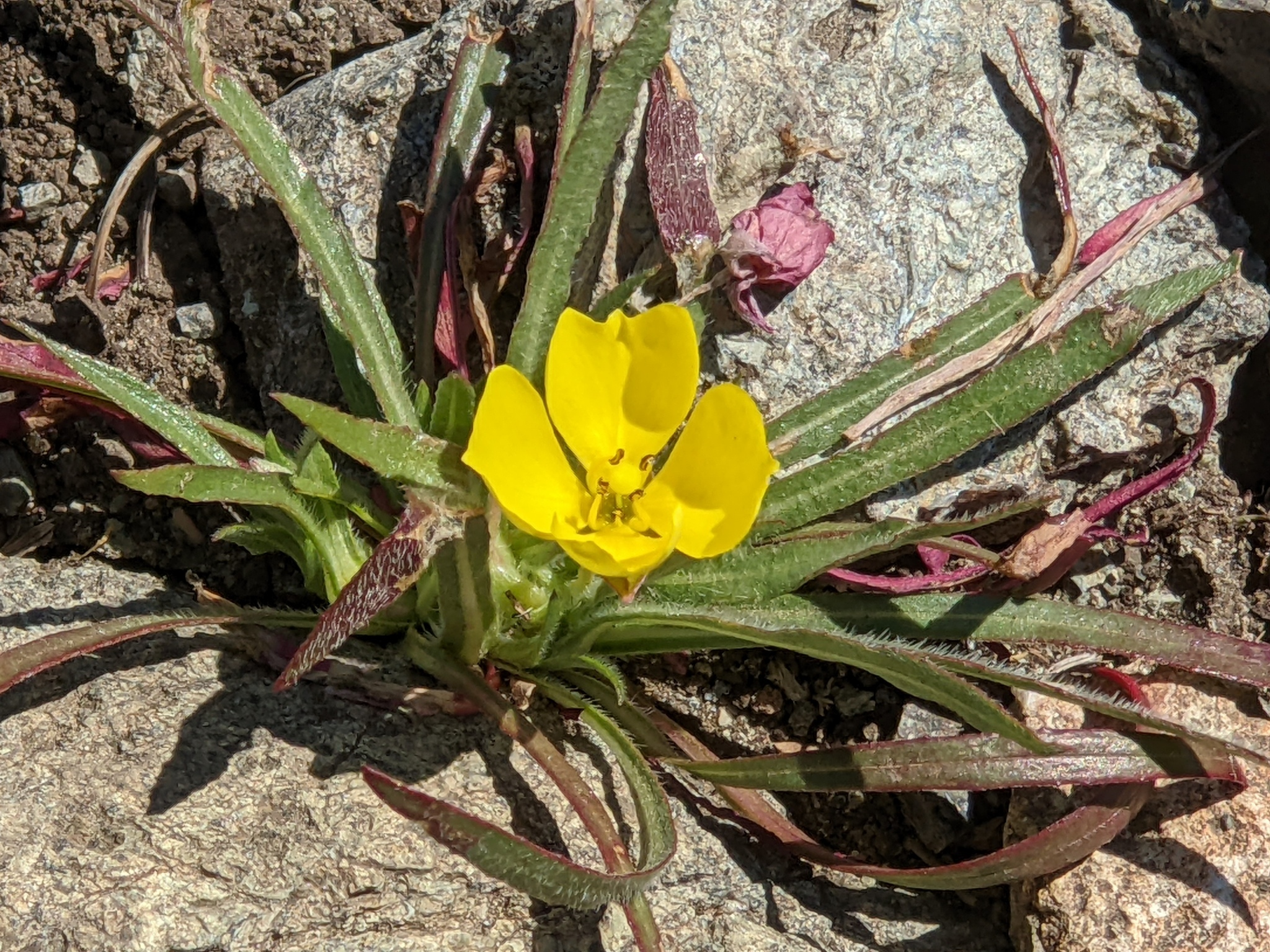

Scientific classification
- Kingdom: Plantae
- Clade: Tracheophytes
- Clade: Angiosperms
- Clade: Eudicots
- Clade: Rosids
- Order: Myrtales
- Family: Onagraceae
- Genus: Tetrapteron
- Species: T. graciliflorum

Binomial name
- Tetrapteron graciliflorum (Hook. & Arn.) W.L.Wagner & Hoch

Synonyms
- Camissonia graciliflora (Hook. & Arn.) P.H.Raven; Oenothera graciliflora Hook. & Arn.; Taraxia graciliflora (Hook. & Arn.) Raim.

= Tetrapteron graciliflorum =

Species of flowering plant

Tetrapteron graciliflorum is a species of evening primrose known by the common name hill suncup. It is native to Oregon and California, where it grows in several habitat types, often on clay soils. It is an annual herb generally with no stem but producing an upright, nodding inflorescence. It features a cluster of narrow leaves, each measuring one to ten centimeters in length. The flowers are adorned with bright yellow petals, ranging from half a centimeter to two centimeters in length. The fruit is a leathery capsule, less than a centimeter long, containing four chambers with bumpy brown seeds.
