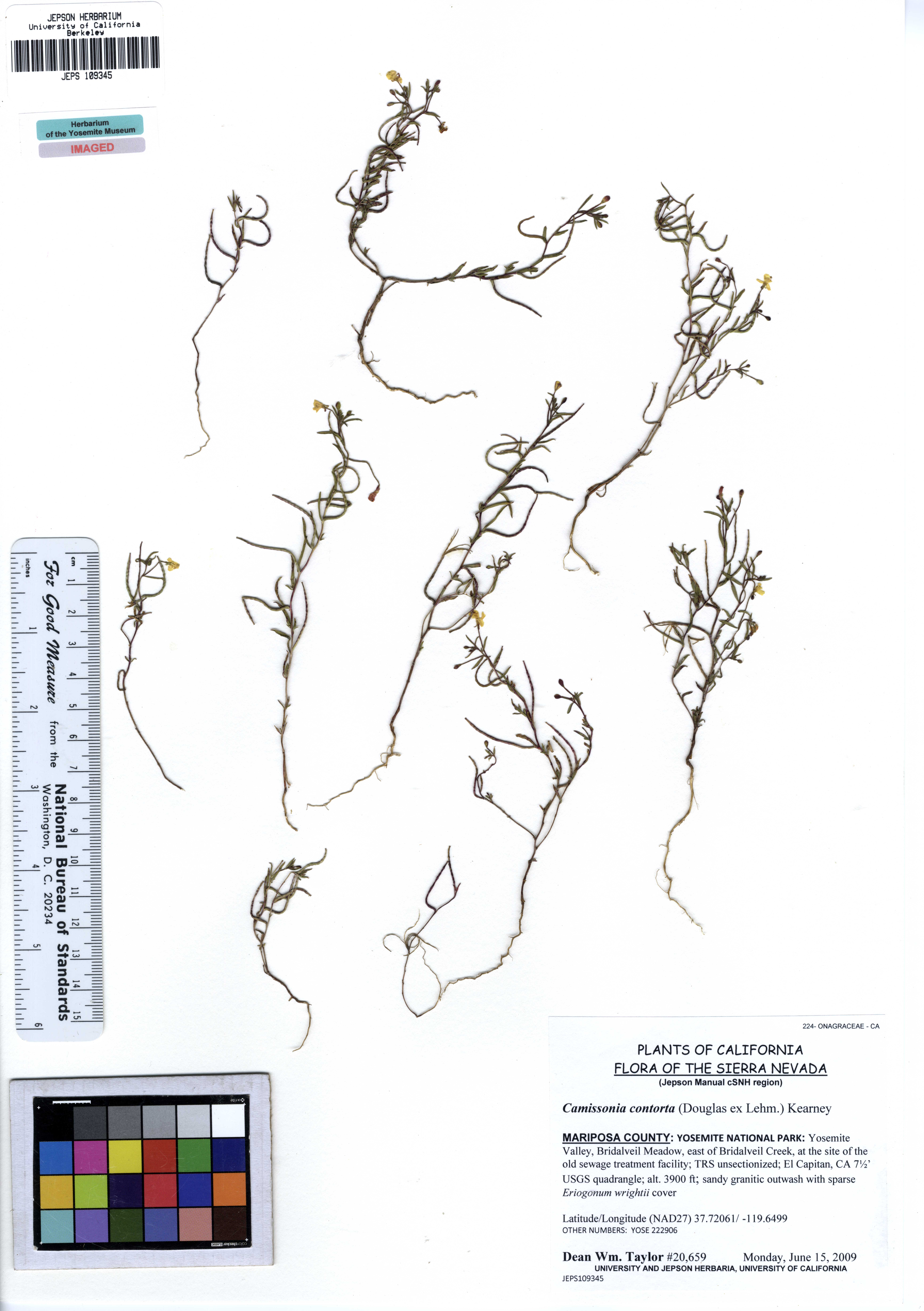

Scientific classification
- Kingdom: Plantae
- Clade: Tracheophytes
- Clade: Angiosperms
- Clade: Eudicots
- Clade: Rosids
- Order: Myrtales
- Family: Onagraceae
- Genus: Camissonia
- Species: C. contorta

Binomial name
- Camissonia contorta (Dougl. ex Lehm.) Kearney

Synonyms
- Oenothera cheiranthifolia var. contorta (Douglas ex Lehm.) H.Lév.; Oenothera contorta Douglas ex Lehm.; Oenothera contorta var. typica Munz; Camissonia contorta var. pubens Kearney; Sphaerostigma contortum var. greenei Small

= Camissonia contorta =

Species of flowering plant

Camissonia contorta is a species of flowering plant, known by the common name plains evening primrose, in the family Onagraceae. It is an annual herb producing a slender, bending to curling red or green stem which is sometimes hairy. It is up to 30 centimeters long and erect or spreading out. The blue-green leaves are linear to very narrowly oval in shape and up to 3.5 centimeters long. The nodding inflorescence produces one or more small flowers. Each has bright yellow petals up to half a centimeter long, sometimes with small red dots near the bases. The fruit is a capsule about 3 centimeters long, containing 50 -100 tiny seeds.

The range of Camissonia contorta includes Transverse Range in California at its southern range limit, north through Oregon, eastern Idaho, and eastern Washington in the United States, to Vancouver Island in British Columbia, Canada at its extreme northern range limit. The species occurs in Köppen climates including BSk (cold semi-arid), Csa (hot summer Mediterranean), and Csb (warm summer Mediterranean). The species is a strict edaphic endemic of sandy soils. The soil can be derived from a diverse array of parent materials (rock types) that yield sandy textured soils, including sandstone, greywacke, chert, granite, and rhyolite (especially volcanic ash and pumice). The species favors (most common, abundant) moderately disturbed sandy soils, especially those worked by water (alluvial deposits along rivers) and wind (sand blow outs). There it occurs in sunny, open gaps between shrubs and trees.

Camissonia contorta is listed as Critically Endangered (Canada rank S1) in British Columbia. In British Columbia, the species primarily occurs on Vancouver Island, immediately along the coastline from Metchosin, north through Victoria, to Sidney. The Koppen climate at Victoria is Csb. Its habitat on the coastline of Vancouver Island consists of semi-stable sandy flats and dunes no more than 15 m above sea level. These represent the northernmost known populations of Camissonia contorta and therefore, the extreme northern range limit of the species. Since this is the extreme northernmost range limit of the species and the only populations of the species known in Canada, it is classified as locally rare and endangered. Throughout the rest of the range of the species; however, it is locally common to abundant and reaches its greatest abundance in California. Camissonia contorta has no list status in the United States and is not regarded as rare.
