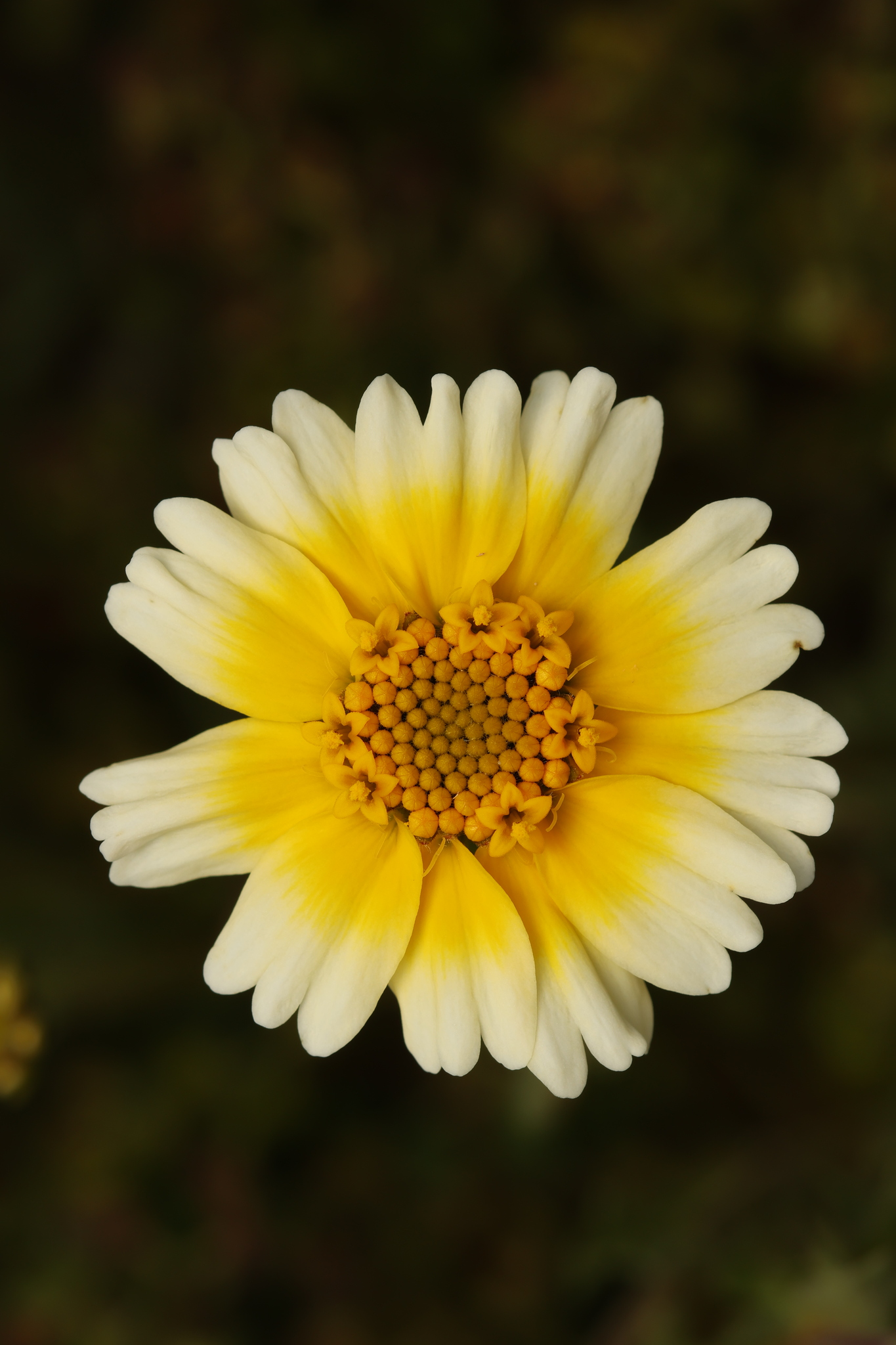

Conservation status
- Imperiled (NatureServe)

Scientific classification
- Kingdom: Plantae
- Clade: Tracheophytes
- Clade: Angiosperms
- Clade: Eudicots
- Clade: Asterids
- Order: Asterales
- Family: Asteraceae
- Genus: Layia
- Species: L. munzii

Binomial name
- Layia munzii Keck

= Layia munzii =

Species of flowering plant

Layia munzii is a rare species of flowering plant in the family Asteraceae known by the common name Munz's tidytips, or Munz's layia.

== Distribution ==
It is endemic to the San Joaquin Valley in California, where it has been eliminated from most of its native range by the conversion of valley land to agriculture. A sizable population still exists on the grasslands of the Carrizo Plain in eastern San Luis Obispo County however.

The plant is similar to its even rarer close relative Layia leucopappa, which grows in a limited piece of habitat nearby in the Tehachapi Mountains.

== Description ==
Munz' tidytips, Layia munzii, is an annual herb producing an erect or trailing glandular stem up to about half a meter tall. The leaves are linear to lance-shaped and sometimes lobed.

The flower head has a base of rough-haired, glandular phyllaries. The face has a fringe of yellow ray florets tipped with white and yellow disc florets with purple anthers.

The fruit is an achene; fruits from the disc florets generally have a white pappus.
