= George Tradescant Lay =

British naturalist, missionary and diplomat

George Tradescant Lay (c. 1800 – 6 November 1845) was a British naturalist, missionary and diplomat.

No appointment was made immediately to Foochow. It was not, indeed, until the latter part of 1844 that steps were taken to introduce the Consular system there. The duty was then entrusted to Mr. Lay, who as an experienced official was well equipped for what was realised would be a difficult and delicate work owing to the fact that the Emperor had only with the greatest reluctance allowed Foochow to be included in the list of Treaty ports. The anticipations of trouble were abundantly realised. Mr. Lay, on landing, found the officials indisposed to grant him a suitable place for residence, and he noticed symptoms of a disposition to slight his authority. At the outset he had to be content with a site in the insalubrious vicinity of the river suburb. But by tactful negotiations he was ultimately able to acquire the lease for resident purposes of a temple on an eminence known as Black Stone Hill, overlooking the city. This temple was beautifully situated amid pleasant groves and terraced gardens and it constituted in every way an agreeable contrast to the ill-placed building at first set apart for the Consulate.

— Arnold Wright, Twentieth Century Impressions of Hongkong, Shanghai, and other Treaty Ports of China, (London, 1908) "Early History and Development", p. 63.

Lay was a naturalist on the English sailing ship HMS Blossom under the command of Captain Frederick William Beechey from 1825 to 1828, where he collected specimens in the Pacific including California, Alaska, Kamchatka, China, Mexico, South America, and Hawaii, and other South Pacific islands. He is credited as being one of the discoverers of the flower Layia gaillardioides, as a result having the genus Layia named for him.

He then went on to become a missionary in China for the British and Foreign Bible Society from 1836 to 1839. During this time, he studied the Chinese language and culture. Upon returning to England in 1839, his experience in China helped him obtain a position of British Consul in China. He was posted in Canton in 1843, then Fuzhou in 1844, and finally Amoy in 1845, before dying later that year from a fever.

His son, Horatio Nelson Lay following in his footsteps, was also a diplomat in China.

== Published works ==
- The Chinese as They are: Their Moral Social and Literary Character
- Trade with China: a letter addressed to the British public on some of the advantages that would result from an occupation of the Bonin Islands. London, 1837. 18pp.

== Taxon described by him ==
- See Category:Taxa named by George Tradescant Lay

== Taxon named in his honor ==
- The genus Layia is named for Lay, who was one of the discoverers of Layia gaillardioides.

== See also ==
- European and American voyages of scientific exploration
