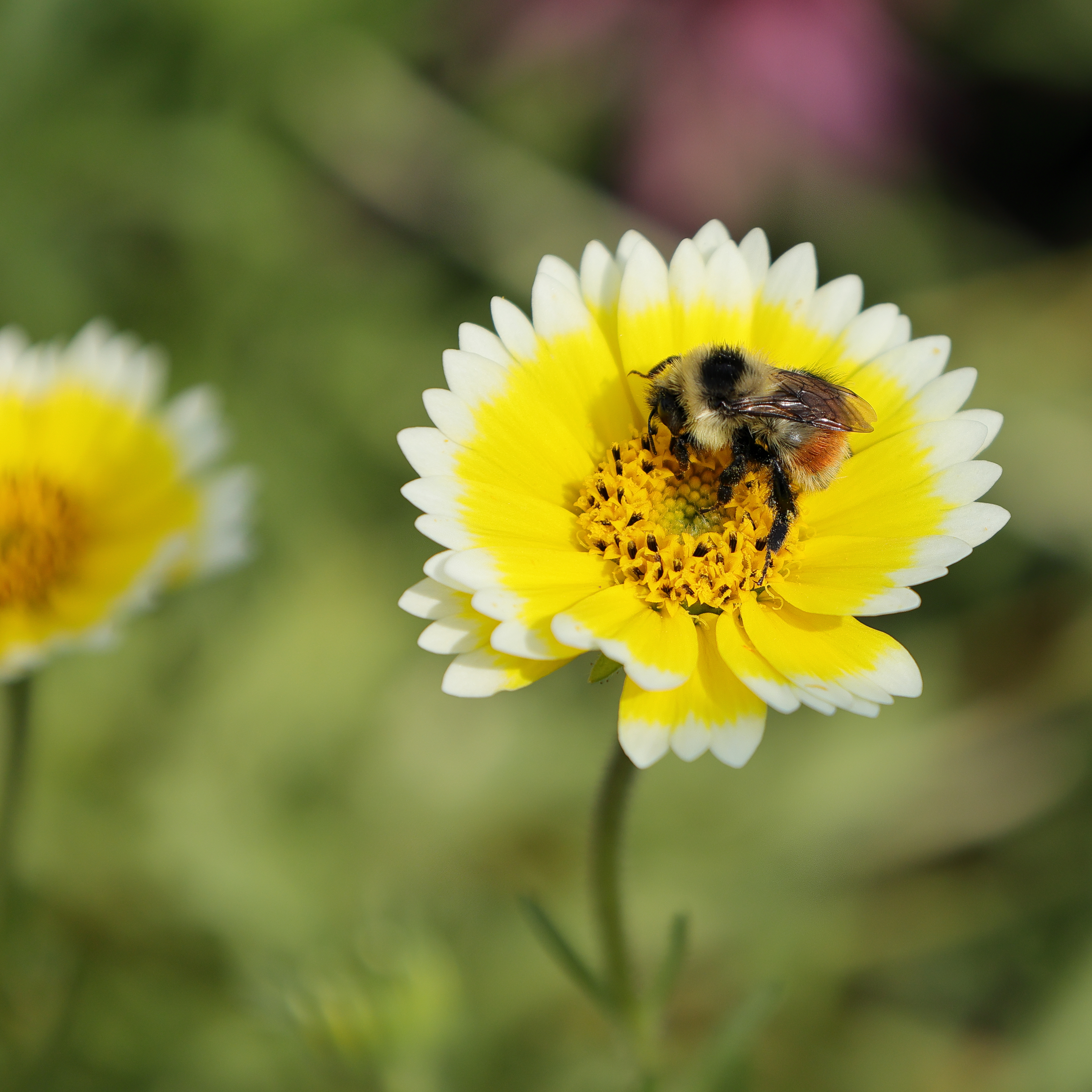

Scientific classification
- Kingdom: Plantae
- Clade: Tracheophytes
- Clade: Angiosperms
- Clade: Eudicots
- Clade: Asterids
- Order: Asterales
- Family: Asteraceae
- Genus: Layia
- Species: L. elegans

Binomial name
- Layia elegans Torr. & A.Gray

Synonyms
- Blepharipappus elegans (Nutt.) Greene

= Layia elegans =

Species of flowering plant

Layia elegans is a species of flowering plants in the family Asteraceae. It is found in California.
