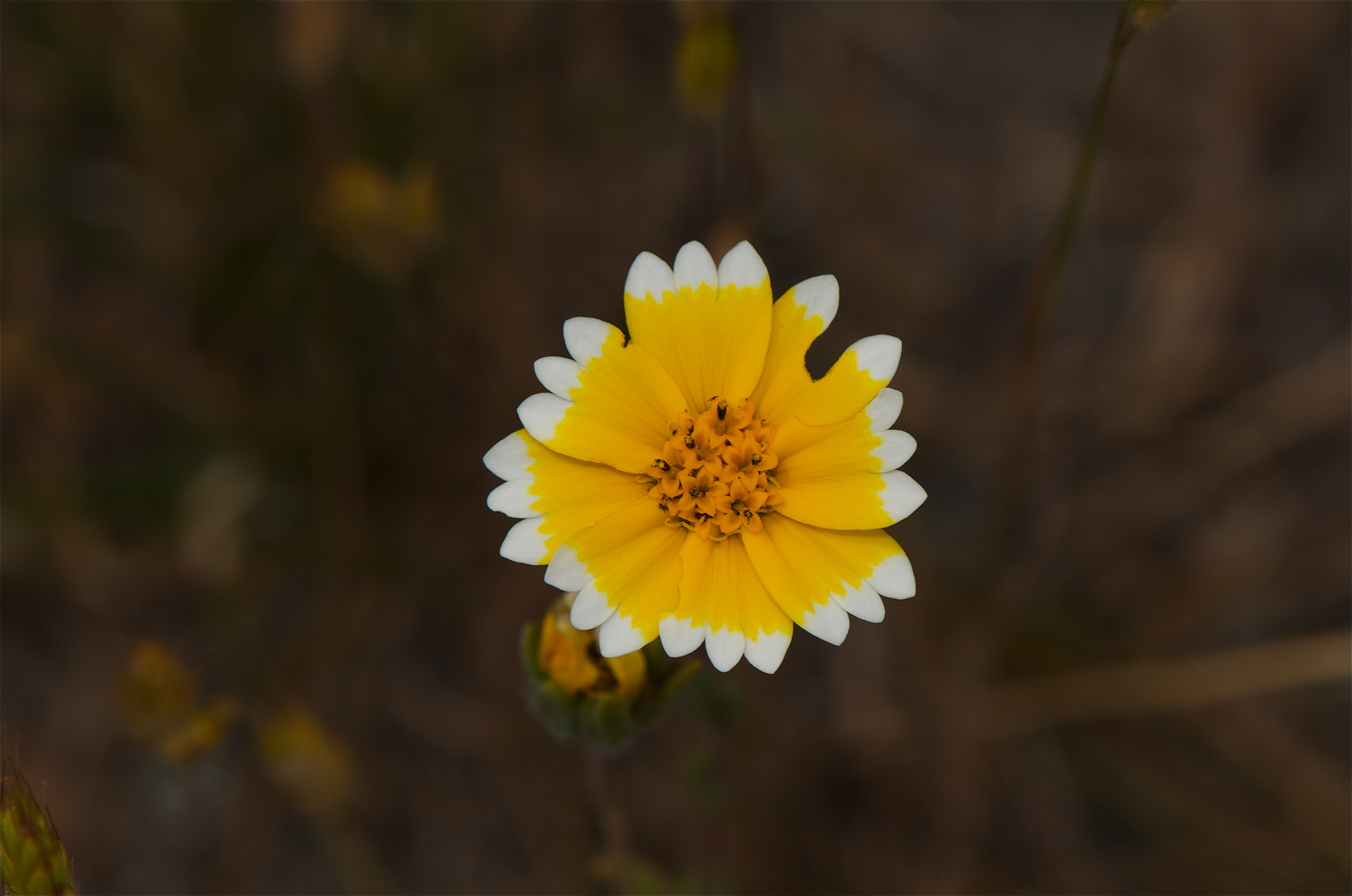

Scientific classification
- Kingdom: Plantae
- Clade: Tracheophytes
- Clade: Angiosperms
- Clade: Eudicots
- Clade: Asterids
- Order: Asterales
- Family: Asteraceae
- Genus: Layia
- Species: L. chrysanthemoides

Binomial name
- Layia chrysanthemoides (DC.) A.Gray

= Layia chrysanthemoides =

Species of flowering plant

Layia chrysanthemoides is a species of flowering plant in the family Asteraceae known by the common name smooth tidytips, or smooth layia.

It is endemic to California, where it lives in several types of habitat along the coast and in inland hills and valleys, and the Central Valley.

== Description ==
This is an annual herb producing an erect, nonglandular stem to a maximum height near half a meter. The leaves are linear or lance-shaped with prickly or fuzzy edges. The lower leaves may be lobed and grow up to about 10 centimeters long.

The flower heads are cups of hairy-edged phyllaries with a fringe of white-tipped golden ray florets around a tightly packed center of yellow disc florets with purple anthers. The fruit is an achene; fruits on the disc florets often have a white bristly pappus.
