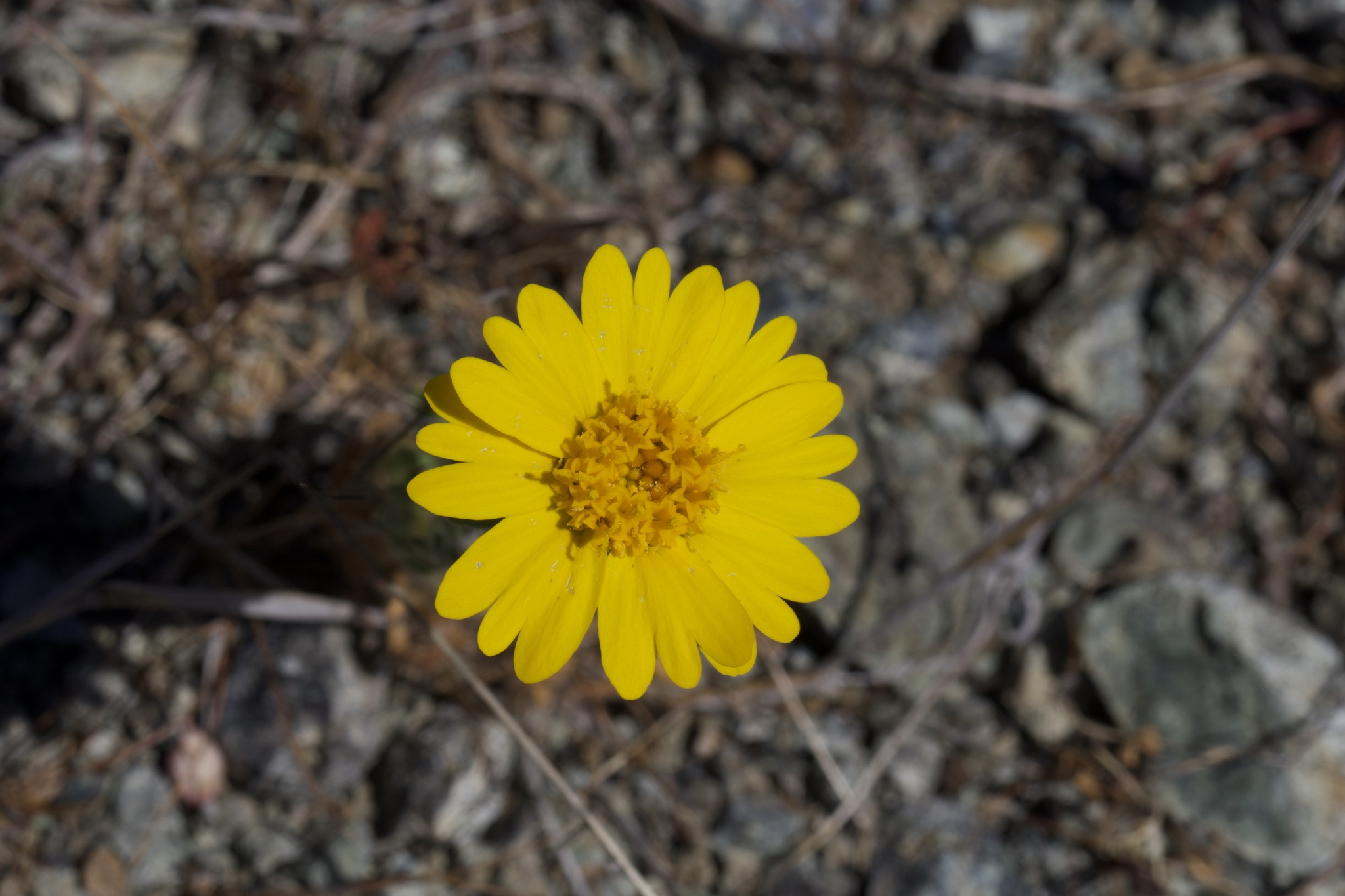

Conservation status
- Imperiled (NatureServe)

Scientific classification
- Kingdom: Plantae
- Clade: Tracheophytes
- Clade: Angiosperms
- Clade: Eudicots
- Clade: Asterids
- Order: Asterales
- Family: Asteraceae
- Genus: Layia
- Species: L. septentrionalis

Binomial name
- Layia septentrionalis Keck

= Layia septentrionalis =

Species of flowering plant

Layia septentrionalis is an uncommon species of flowering plant in the family Asteraceae known by the common name Colusa tidytips, or Colusa layia.

It is endemic to California, where it is known only from the Coast Ranges north of the San Francisco Bay Area and the Sutter Buttes in the Central Valley. It is sometimes a member of the serpentine soils flora.

== Description ==
This is a small annual herb producing a glandular stem up to about 35 centimeters tall. The leaves are linear to lance-shaped, with the lower ones lobed and up to about 7 centimeters in length. The daisylike flower heads contain toothed yellow ray florets and yellow disc florets with yellow anthers. The fruit is an achene; fruits on the disc florets have a long white pappus of plumelike bristles.
