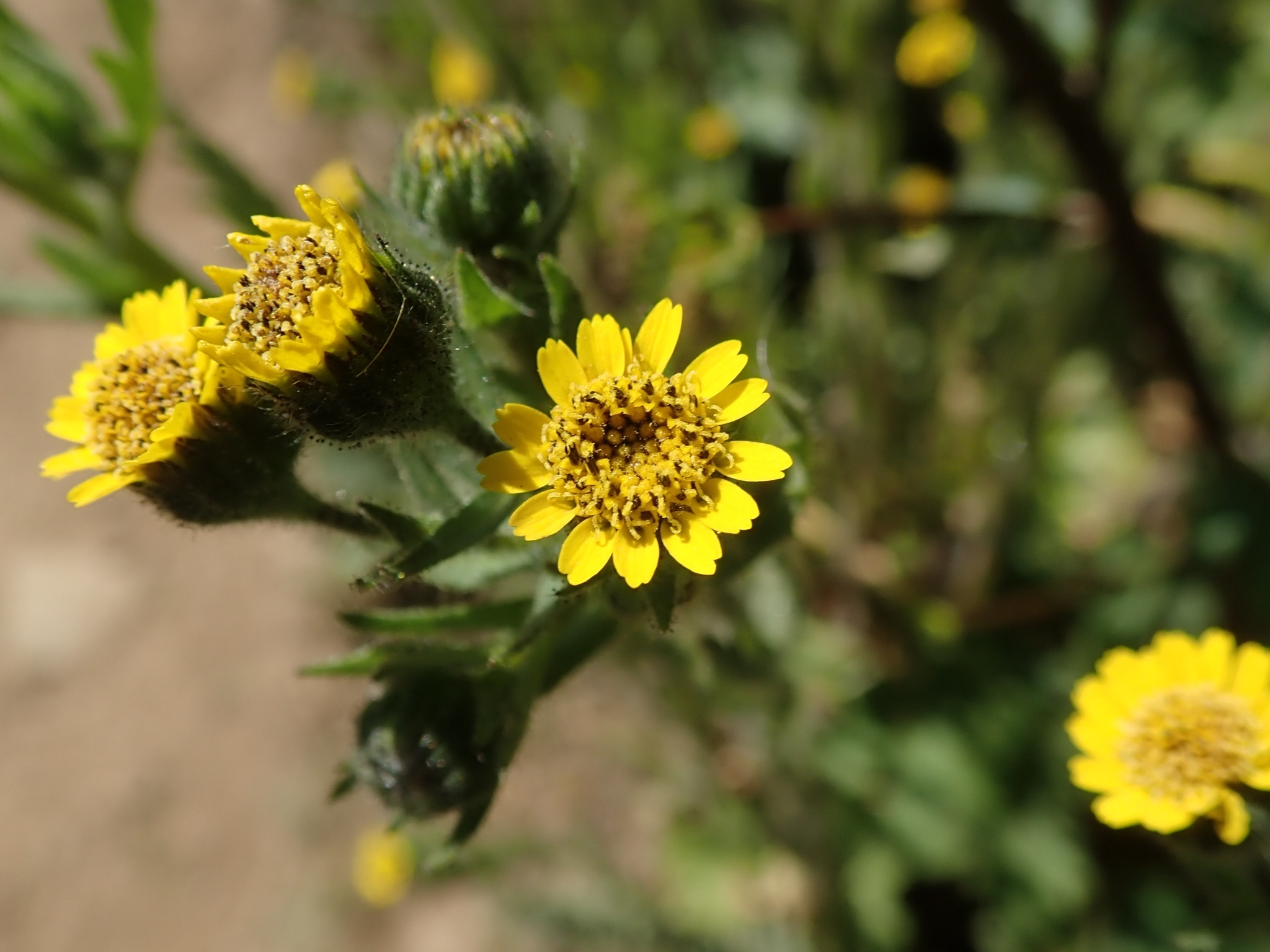

Scientific classification
- Kingdom: Plantae
- Clade: Tracheophytes
- Clade: Angiosperms
- Clade: Eudicots
- Clade: Asterids
- Order: Asterales
- Family: Asteraceae
- Genus: Layia
- Species: L. hieracioides

Binomial name
- Layia hieracioides (DC.) Hook. & Arn.

= Layia hieracioides =

Species of plant

Layia hieracioides is a species of flowering plant in the family Asteraceae known by the common name tall tidytips, or tall layia.

It is endemic to California, where it is known from around the San Francisco Bay Area to the Transverse Ranges behind Los Angeles.

== Description ==
Layia hieracioides is an annual herb producing a thick, glandular, strongly scented stem to a maximum height near 1.3 meters, but often remains shorter. The thin leaves are linear to lance-shaped, with the lower ones lobed or toothed and up to nearly 15 centimeters in maximum length. The flower head has a rounded to urn-shaped base of green phyllaries covered in dark glandular hairs. The head contains short yellow ray florets only a few millimeters long around a center of yellow disc florets with purple anthers. The fruit is an achene; fruits on the disc florets have a pappus of bristles.
