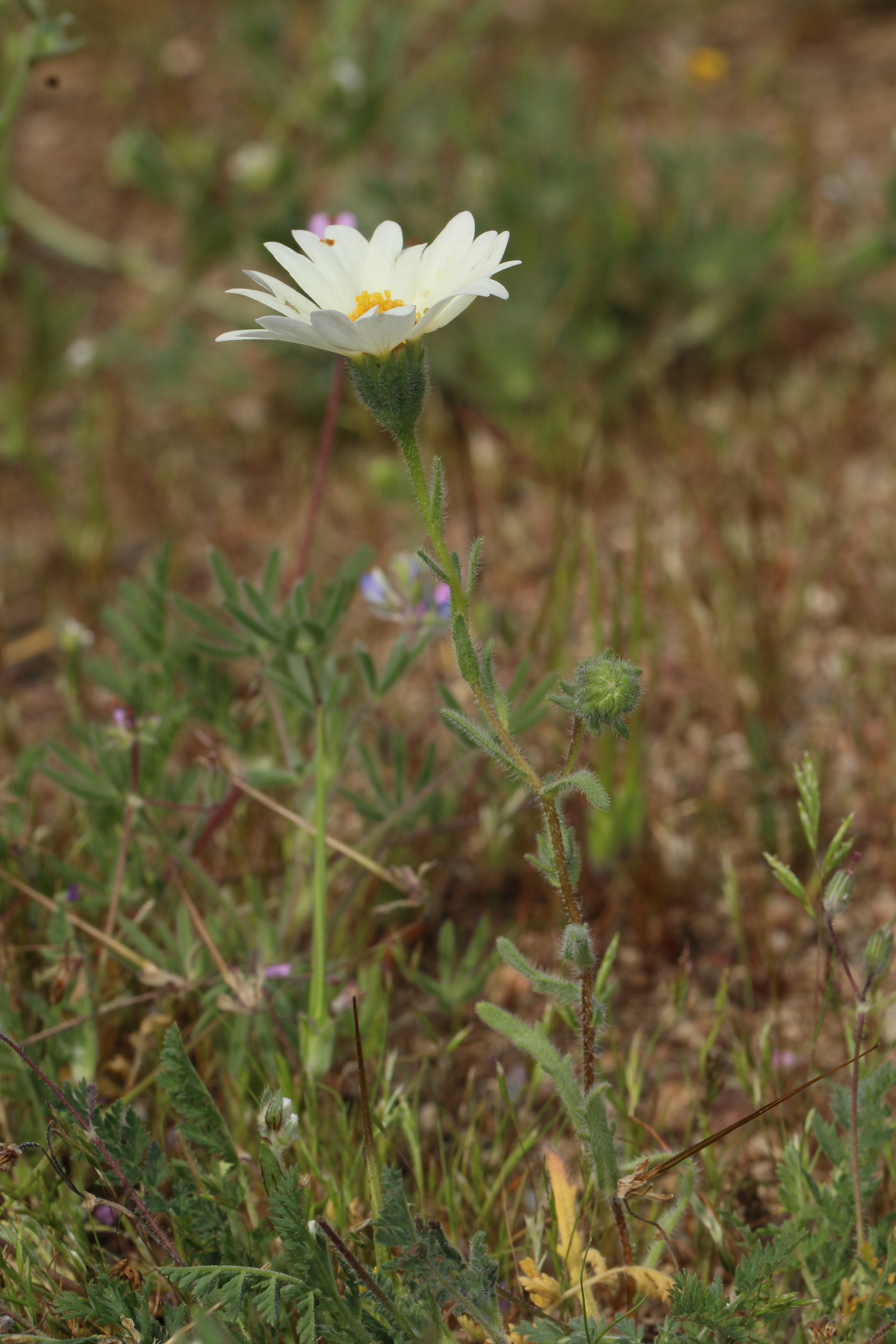

Scientific classification
- Kingdom: Plantae
- Clade: Tracheophytes
- Clade: Angiosperms
- Clade: Eudicots
- Clade: Asterids
- Order: Asterales
- Family: Asteraceae
- Genus: Layia
- Species: L. glandulosa

Binomial name
- Layia glandulosa (Hook.) Hook. & Arn.

= Layia glandulosa =

Species of flowering plant

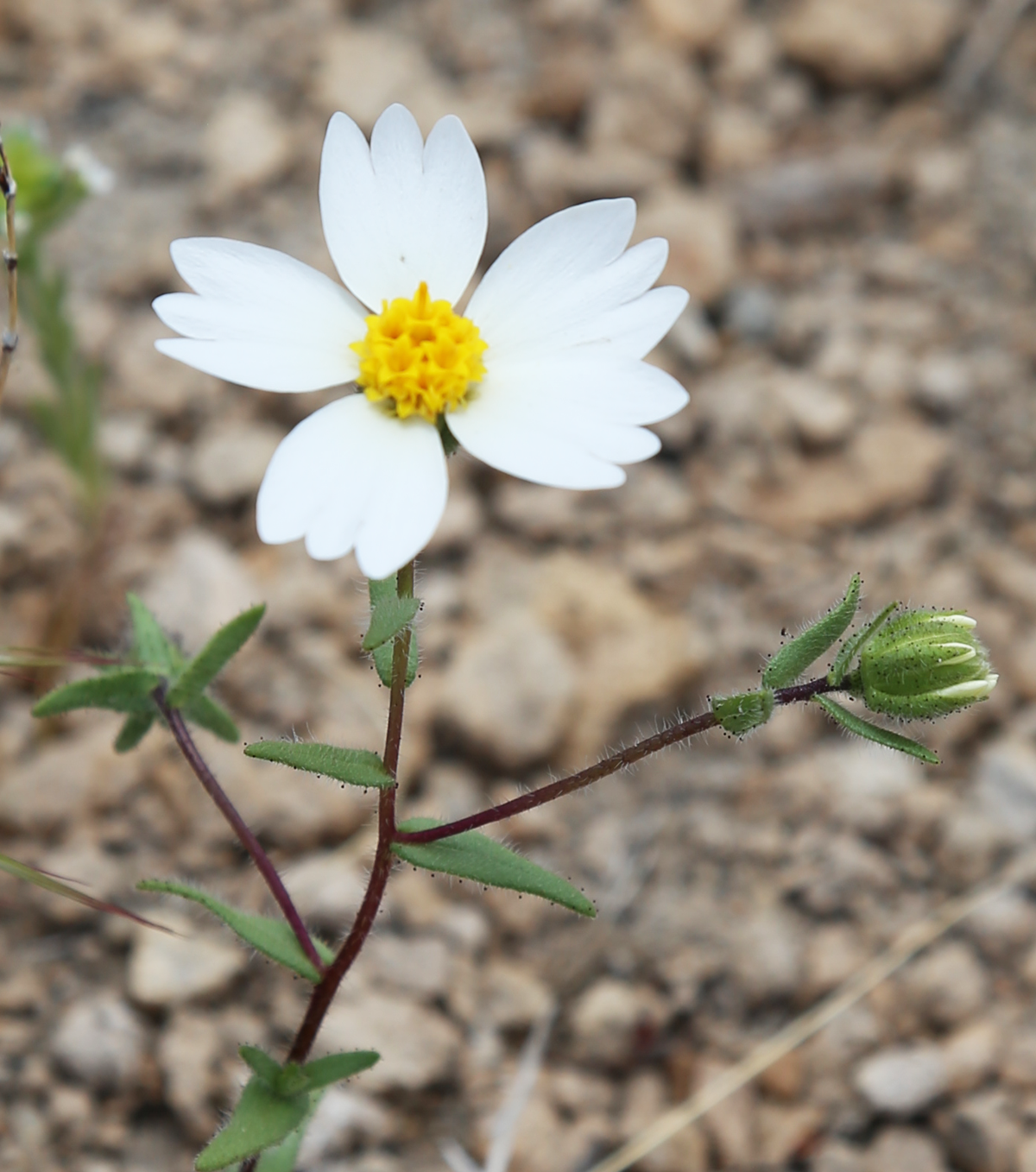
Full-face flower and bud

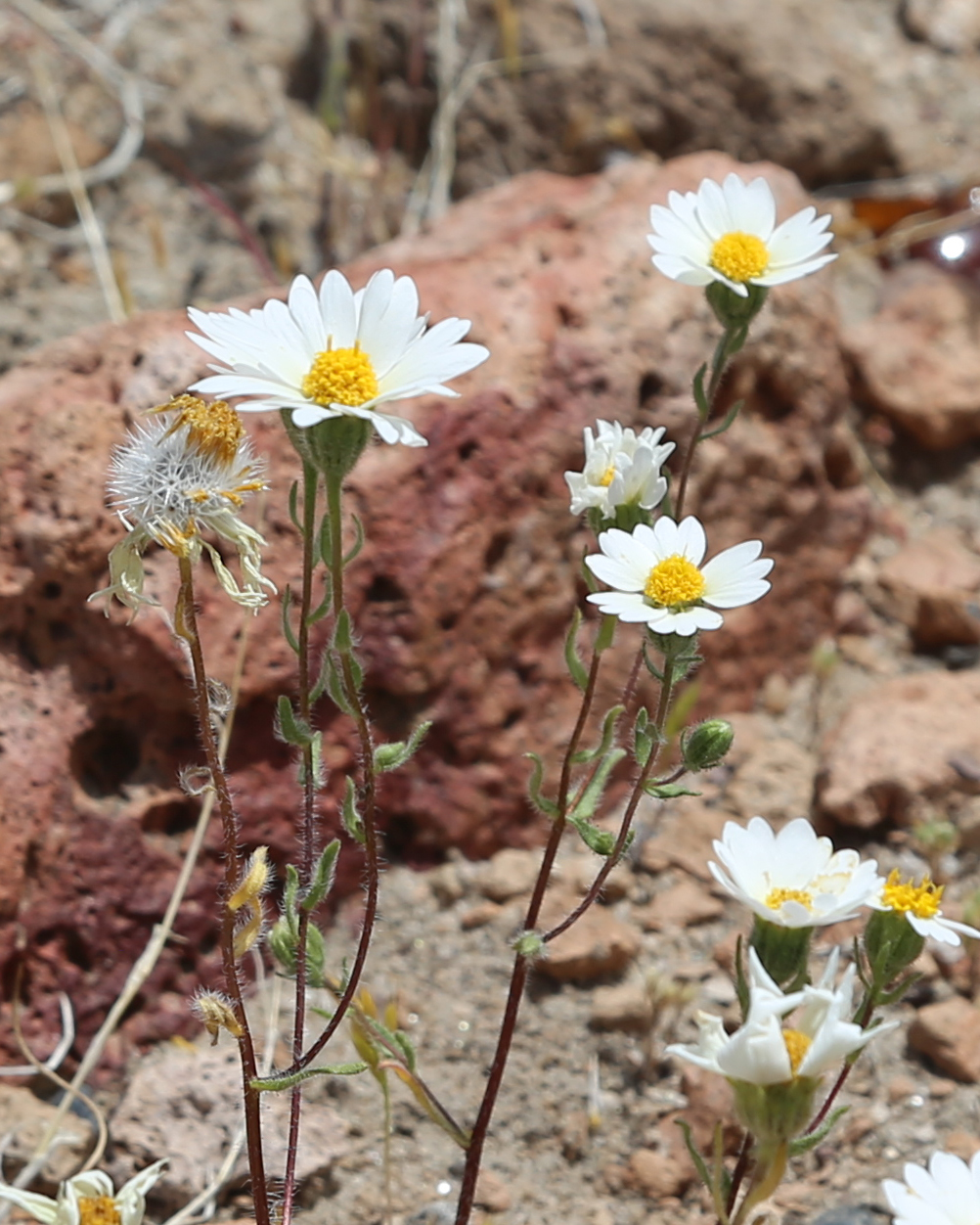
Flowers and seedhead

Layia glandulosa is a species of flowering plant in the family Asteraceae known by the common names whitedaisy tidytips and white layia. It is native to western North America south from central Washington (state) to Baja California and east to Utah and Arizona, where it is common in a number of habitat types.

== Description ==
This is an annual herb producing an erect stem to a maximum height just over one-half meter (1 ft 8 in). The stem and foliage are dotted with dark glandular hairs and the plant is sometimes scented. The thin leaves are linear to oval-shaped, with the lower ones often lobed, approaching 10 centimeters (4 in) in maximum length.

The flower head has a base of green, hairy, glandular phyllaries. The face is fringed with 3–14 (typically 5) broad, 3-lobed ray florets which are usually white, but sometimes yellow. The center contains yellow disc florets with yellow anthers. The fruit is a hairy achene; fruits on disc florets have a pappus of stiff white hairs.

The species is similar to Blepharipappus scaber, which has white disc flowers.
