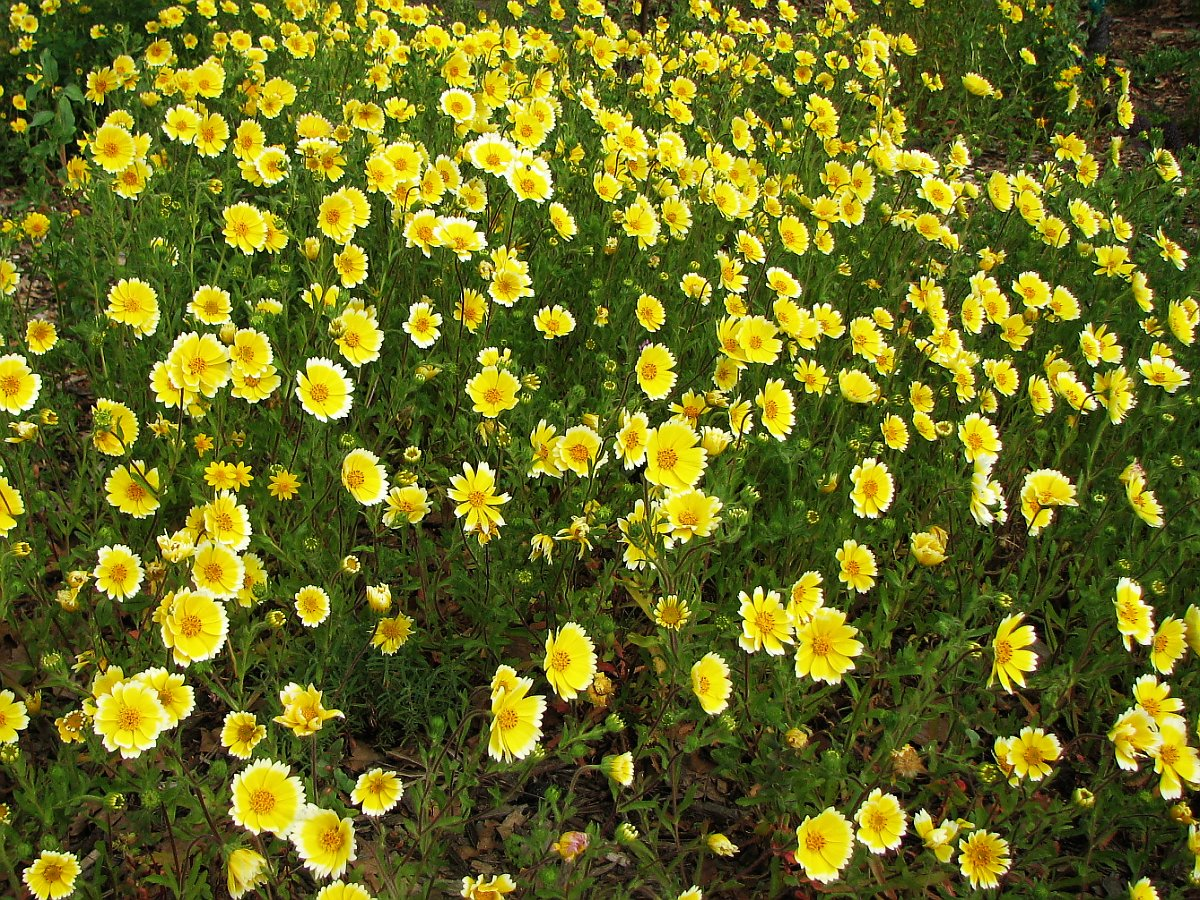

Scientific classification
- Kingdom: Plantae
- Clade: Tracheophytes
- Clade: Angiosperms
- Clade: Eudicots
- Clade: Asterids
- Order: Asterales
- Family: Asteraceae
- Genus: Layia
- Species: L. platyglossa

Binomial name
- Layia platyglossa ( Fisch. & C.A.Mey.) A.Gray

= Layia platyglossa =

Species of flowering plant

Layia platyglossa, commonly called coastal tidytips, is an annual wildflower of the family Asteraceae, native to western North America.

== Distribution ==
Tidytips was formerly found throughout low-elevation dry habitats in California including the Mojave Desert and into Arizona and Utah. In pre-European times this plant was common in solid stands at lower elevations. Found in grassy valley floors, slopes of hills, openings in coastal sage scrub and chaparral, coastal plains, and in the High Desert. A member of Spring wildflower 'displays,' blooming March to June.

This species is also found in Mexico, in the state of Baja California. It can be commonly found from Tijuana south to the Sierra de La Asamblea in the central part of the state. It is also found on Guadalupe Island in the Pacific Ocean.

== Description ==
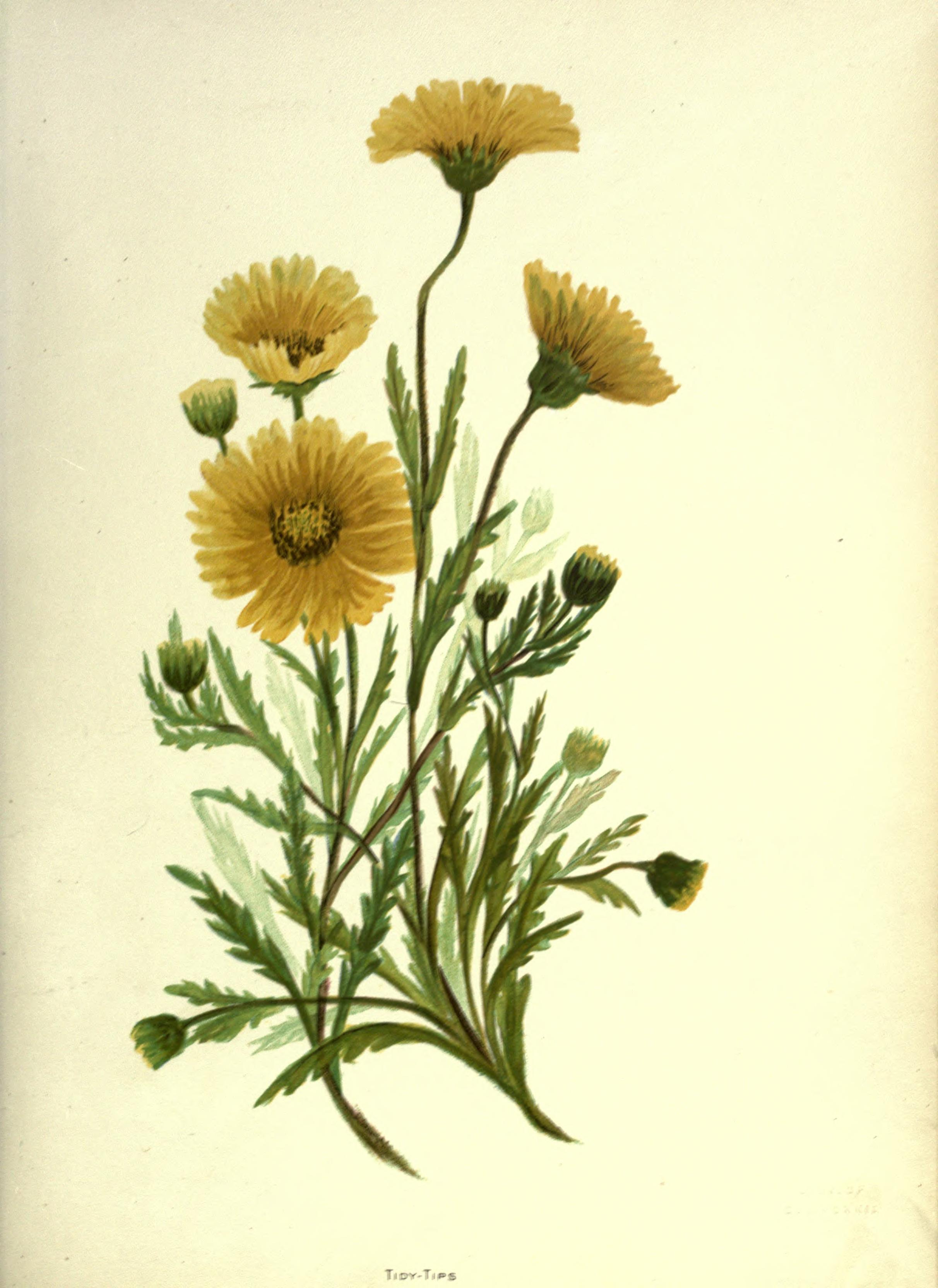
Layia platyglossa botanical illustration, 1887

Layia platyglossa is an annual, glandular, daisy like plant with narrow, rough hairy leaves. The height of the entire plant is less than 1 foot (0.30 m), roughly around 4–12 inches (10–30 cm) wide. The roots are usually taproots, sometimes fibrous.

The leaves at the upper part of the stem are short and have a pilous texture. The leaves at the basal part of the stem can be dentate to pinnate shaped with rotund short lobes. The lower leaves are generally lobed and the upper leaves are entire. Leaves usually alternate or opposite, and the blades are usually simple, rarely compound.

Flowers

The plant is an indeterminate zygomorphic inflorescent, individual heads are borne on a peduncle. The stems are usually erect, prostrate or decumbent to ascending, and are stout and corymbed branched.

The flower heads are composed of five to eighteen yellow ray flowers with white tips and many central yellow disk flowers. Its outer ray flowers are bright golden yellow with distinct, sharp-margined white tips. The bracts tips are rounded and involucre 6–12 mm high. The corolla is 4–6 mm long. The ray flowers are 3–3.8 mm long and the disk flowers are 2.8–5 mm long. The ligules are 6–15 mm long and 5–10 mm wide. The florets are bisexual, pistillate, functionally staminate or neuter. The sepals are highly modified.

Pollination is done by insects. The fruits are usually dry with thick, tough pericarps, sometimes rostrate and/or winged. Dispersion is done by the help from pappi (dispersal of fruit by wind). Seeds are one per fruit, embryos straight.

== Cultivation ==
Ornamental

Layia platyglossa is cultivated as an ornamental plant. It is often an ingredient in commercial wildflower seed mixes. The daisy-like flowers are attractive, making it a popular annual flower in traditional gardens, wildlife gardens, and habitat gardens.

Restoration

The wildflower is used in habitat restoration projects, and is a pollinator supportive plant. The ripe seeds are a food source for birds.

== Gallery ==
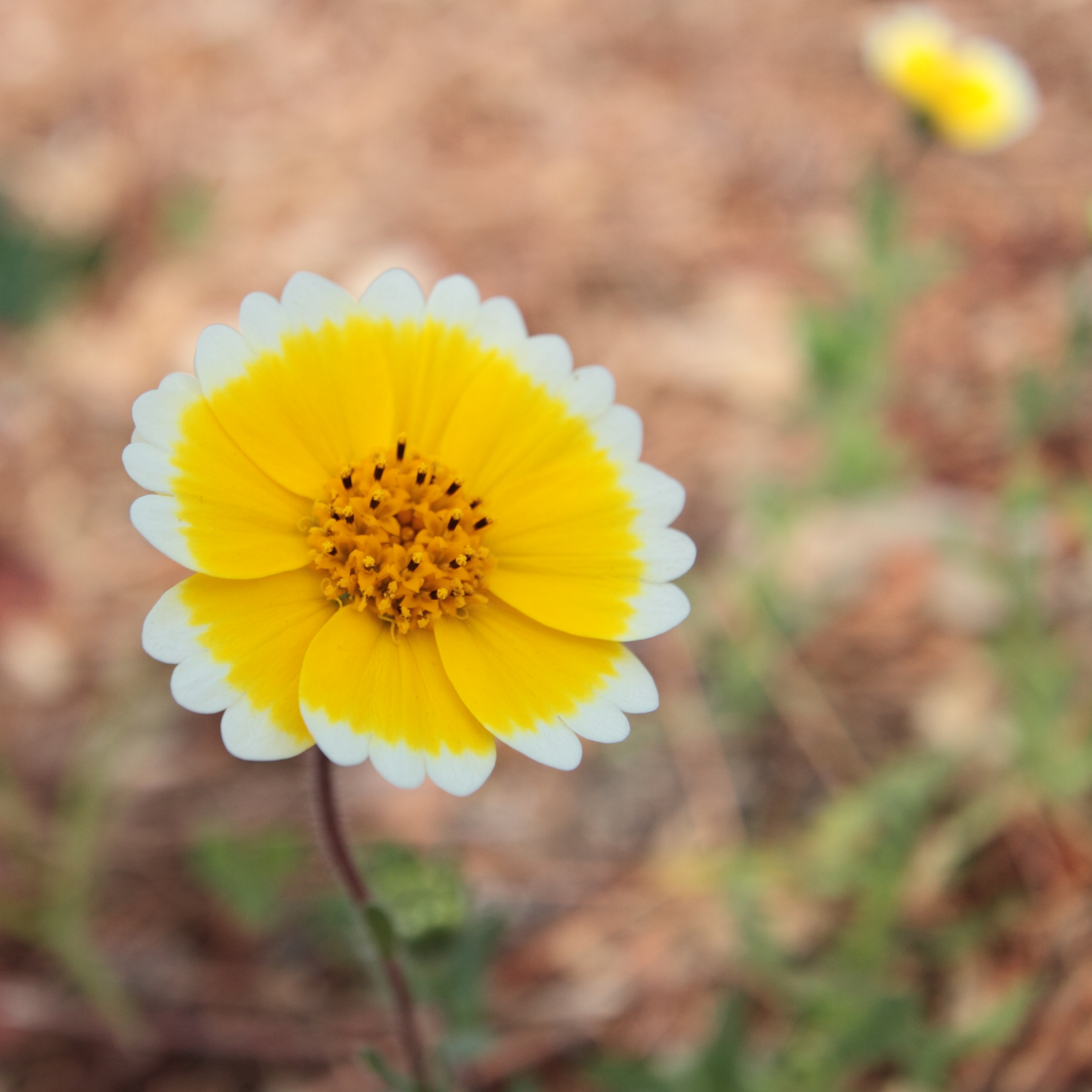

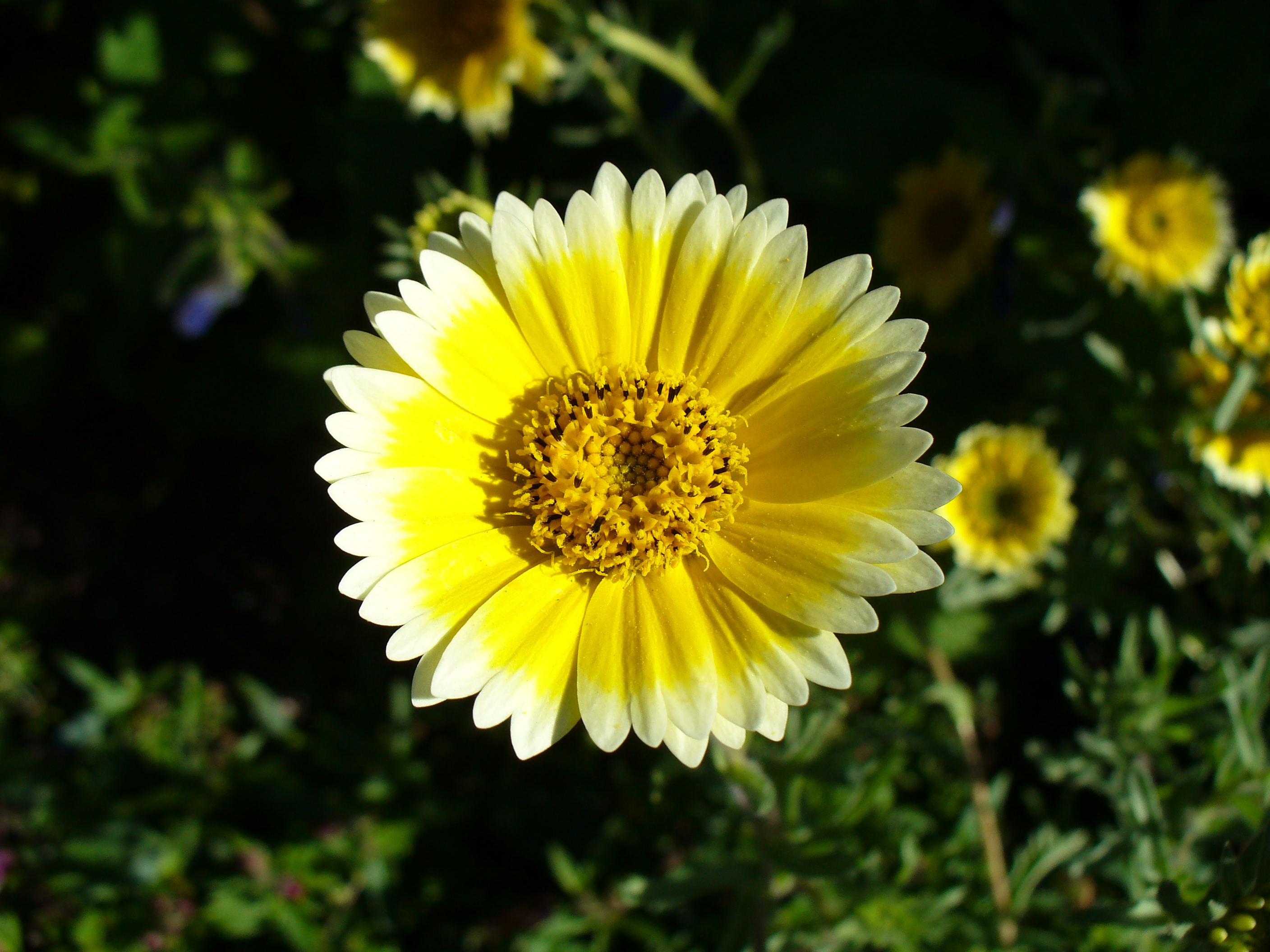

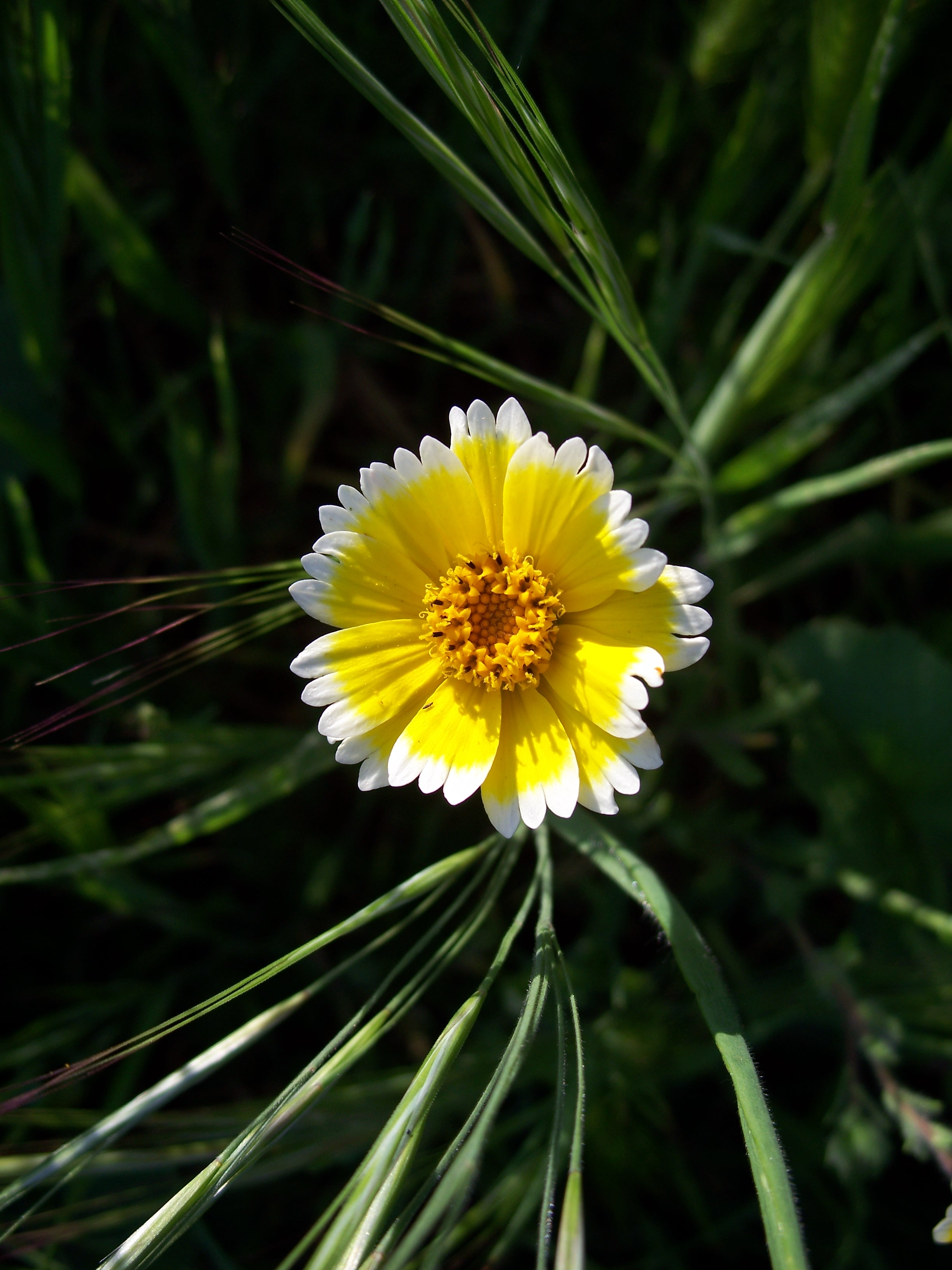
