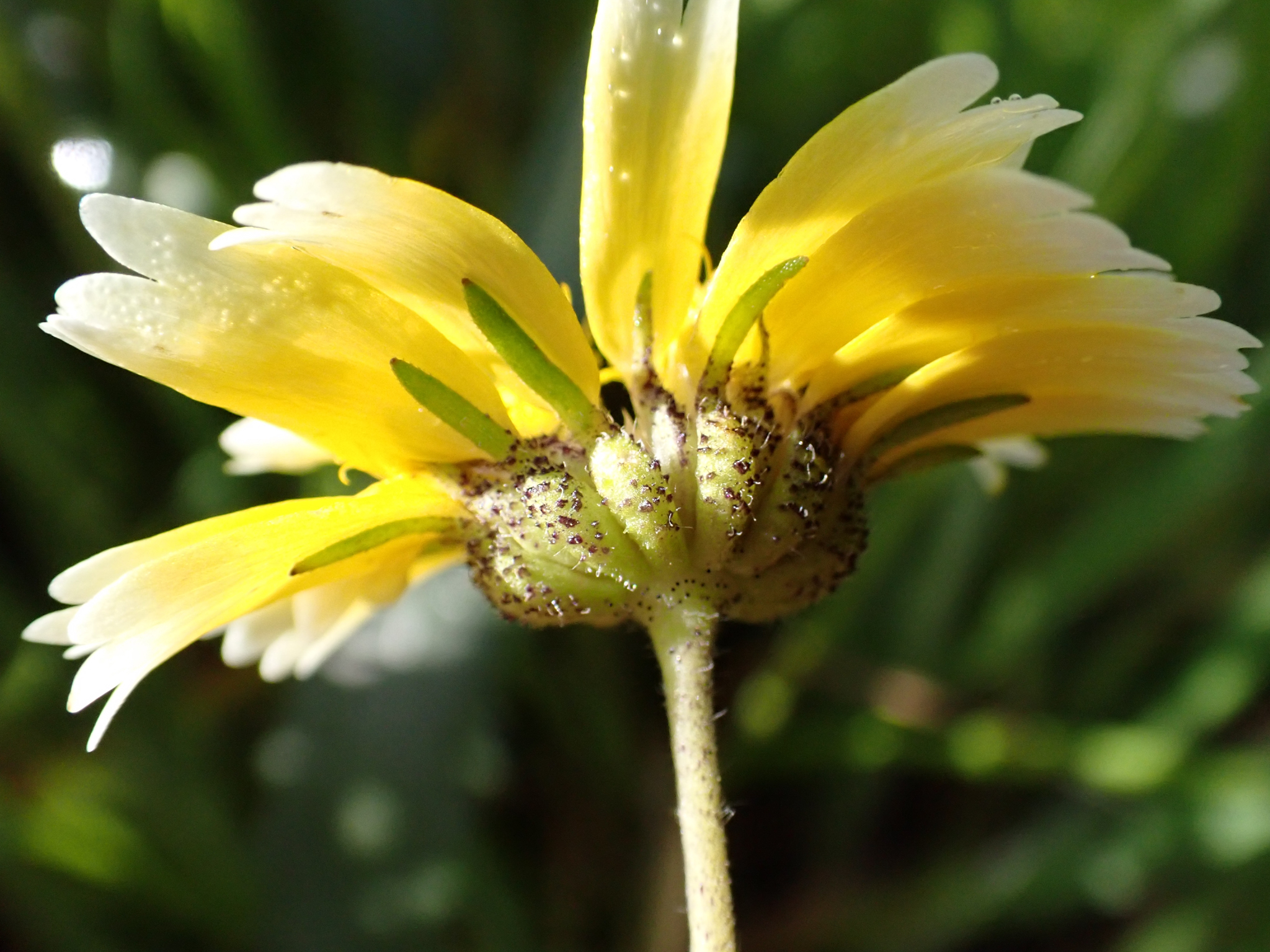

Conservation status
- Imperiled (NatureServe)

Scientific classification
- Kingdom: Plantae
- Clade: Tracheophytes
- Clade: Angiosperms
- Clade: Eudicots
- Clade: Asterids
- Order: Asterales
- Family: Asteraceae
- Genus: Layia
- Species: L. jonesii

Binomial name
- Layia jonesii A.Gray

= Layia jonesii =

Species of flowering plant

Layia jonesii is a species of flowering plant in the family Asteraceae known by the common name Jones' tidytips, or Jones' layia.

It is endemic to California, where it is known only from coastal San Luis Obispo County. It grows on clay and serpentine soils.

== Description ==
This is an annual herb growing a glandular but unscented stem to a maximum height near half a meter. The fleshy leaves are linear to lance-shaped, with the lower ones often having lobes and reaching near 7 centimeters in maximum length.

The flower head has an urn-shaped base of rough, hairy phyllaries. The face has a fringe of yellow ray florets with white tips and a center of yellow disc florets with purple anthers. The fruit is an achene; the fruits of the disc florets sometimes have a pappus of scales.
