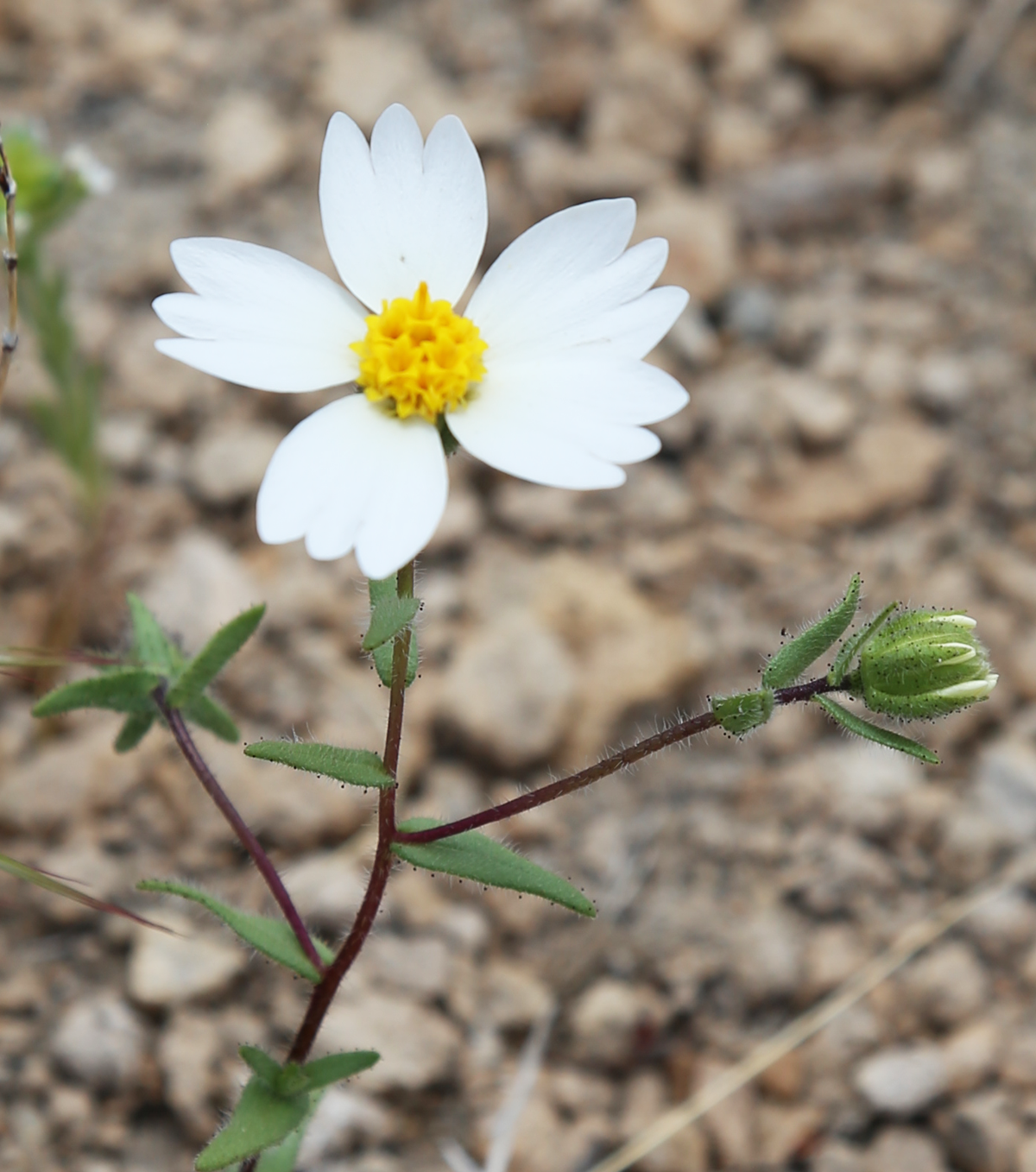
- Layia glandulosa

Scientific classification
- Kingdom: Plantae
- Clade: Embryophytes
- Clade: Tracheophytes
- Clade: Angiosperms
- Clade: Eudicots
- Clade: Asterids
- Order: Asterales
- Family: Asteraceae
- Subfamily: Asteroideae
- Tribe: Madieae
- Subtribe: Madiinae
- Genus: Layia; Hook. & Arn. ex DC. 1838, conserved name, not Hook. & Arn. 183 (syn of Ormosia in Fabaceae)

Synonyms
- Callichroa Fisch. & C.A.Mey.; Eriopappus Arn.; Oxyura DC.; Madaroglossa DC.; Tollatia Endl.; Calliachyris Torr. & A.Gray ex Torr. & A.Gray; Calliglossa Hook. & Arn.

= Layia =

Genus of flowering plants

Layia is a genus of flowering plants in the family Asteraceae known generally as tidy tips, native to western North America. Several are California endemics.

These are erect daisylike annual herbs with dark glandular stems. The flower heads usually contain white or yellow ray florets; some species have yellow florets tipped sharply in white which give the flowers their common name. The genus is named for naturalist George Tradescant Lay, who was one of the discoverers of Layia gaillardioides.

== Species ==
Sources:

- Layia calliglossa - CA
- Layia carnosa - beach tidytips - CA
- Layia chrysanthemoides - smooth tidytips - CA
- Layia discoidea - rayless tidytips - CA
- Layia douglasii - OR WA
- Layia elegans - CA
- Layia erubescens - CA
- Layia fremontii - Frémont's tidytips - CA
- Layia gaillardioides - woodland tidytips - CA
- Layia glandulosa - white daisy tidytips - CA AZ NM NV UT ID OR WA, Baja California
- Layia heterotricha - pale yellow tidytips - CA
- Layia hieracioides - tall tidytips - CA
- Layia hispida - CA
- Layia jonesii - Jones' tidytips - CA
- Layia leucopappa - Comanche Point tidytips - CA
- Layia munzii - Munz' tidytips - CA
- Layia nemorosa - CA
- Layia pentachaeta - Sierra tidytips - CA
- Layia platyglossa - common tidytips - CA AZ UT
- Layia septentrionalis - Colusa tidytips - CA
