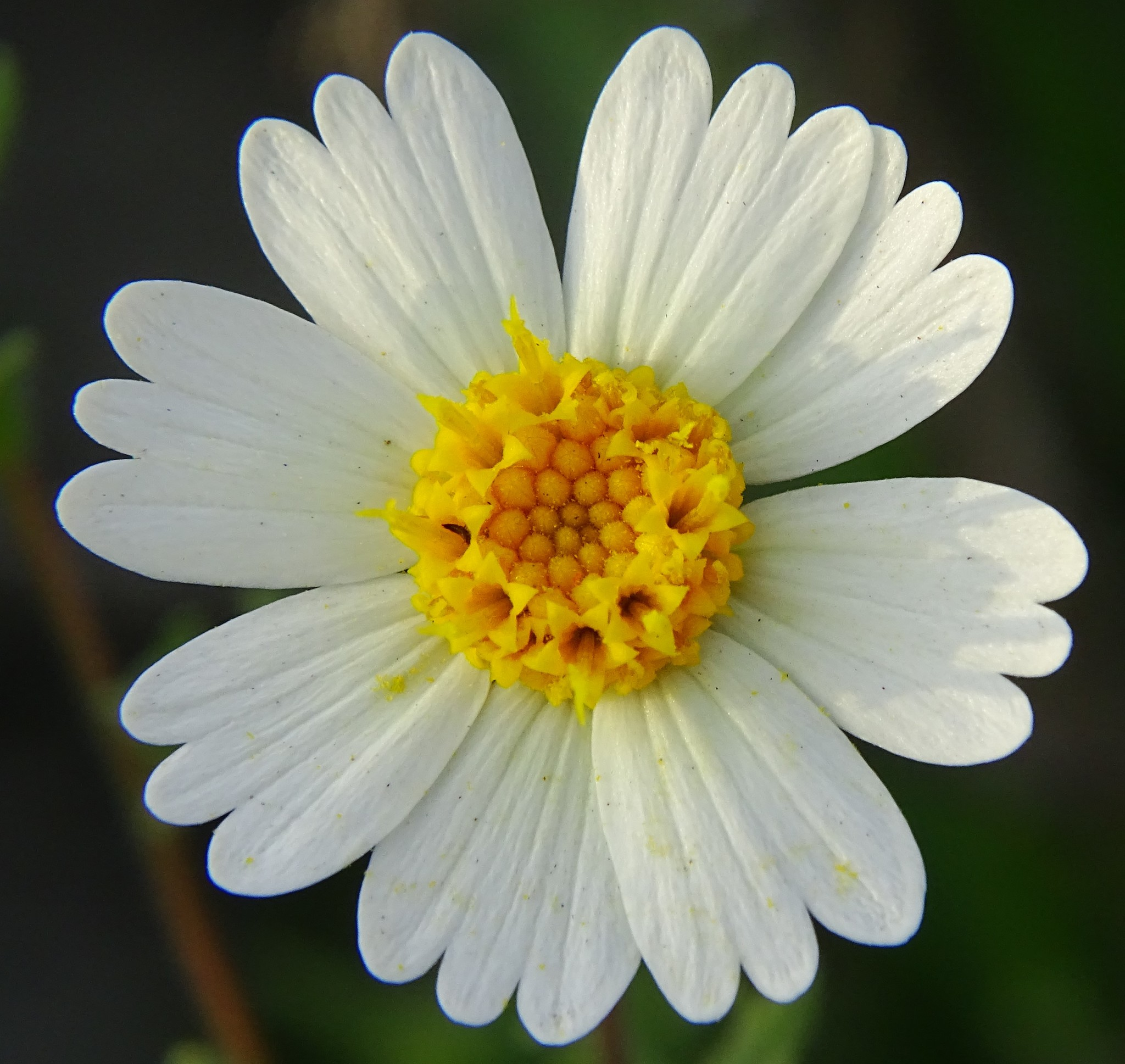
- Layia pentachaeta subsp. albida

Scientific classification
- Kingdom: Plantae
- Clade: Tracheophytes
- Clade: Angiosperms
- Clade: Eudicots
- Clade: Asterids
- Order: Asterales
- Family: Asteraceae
- Genus: Layia
- Species: L. pentachaeta

Binomial name
- Layia pentachaeta A.Gray

= Layia pentachaeta =

Species of flowering plant

Layia pentachaeta is a species of flowering plant in the family Asteraceae known by the common name Sierra tidytips, or Sierra layia.

== Distribution and habitat ==
The wildflower is endemic to California, where it grows in a number of habitats in the central part of the state from the Sierra Nevada (foothills and High Sierra) to the Tehachapi Mountains, the San Joaquin Valley, and the central Inner California Coast Ranges.

== Description ==
Layia pentachaeta is an annual herb growing a thick stem up to a meter (3 ft) tall, but often remaining shorter. The stem is coated in glandular hairs whose exudate gives the plant a sharp lemonlike scent.

The thin leaves are linear to lance-shaped, with the lower leaves lobed and approaching 11 centimeters in maximum length.

The flower head contains white or yellow ray florets and yellow disc florets with yellow anthers. The fruit is an achene; fruits on the disc florets often have a white bristly pappus.
