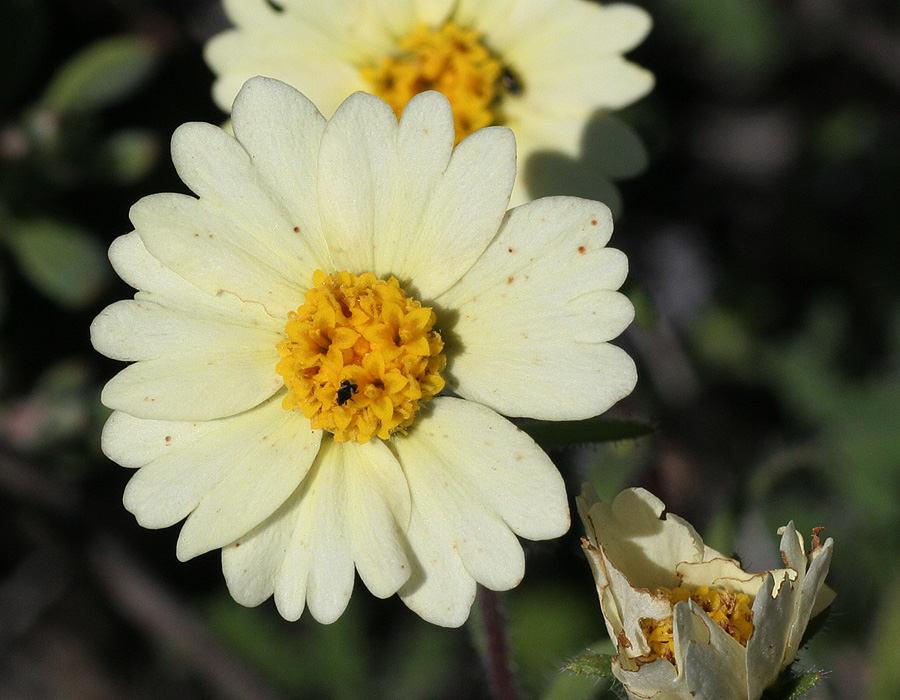

Conservation status
- Imperiled (NatureServe)

Scientific classification
- Kingdom: Plantae
- Clade: Tracheophytes
- Clade: Angiosperms
- Clade: Eudicots
- Clade: Asterids
- Order: Asterales
- Family: Asteraceae
- Genus: Layia
- Species: L. heterotricha

Binomial name
- Layia heterotricha (DC.) Hook. &Arn.

= Layia heterotricha =

Species of flowering plant

Layia heterotricha is a species of flowering plant in the family Asteraceae known by the common name pale yellow tidytips, or pale yellow layia.

== Distribution ==
It is endemic to California, where it is known from several areas in the west-central part of the state, such as the Santa Monica Mountains and lower San Joaquin Valley.

== Description ==
Layia heterotricha is an annual herb producing a thick, erect stem to a maximum height near 90 centimeters. The stem and foliage are covered thinly in dark glandular hairs and the plant has a scent similar to apples or bananas. The leaves are oval-shaped, fleshy, and sometimes slightly toothed.

The flower head contains white to pale yellow ray florets each up to 2.5 centimeters long, and many yellow disc florets with yellow anthers. The fruit is an achene; fruits on the disc florets often have a long pappus.
