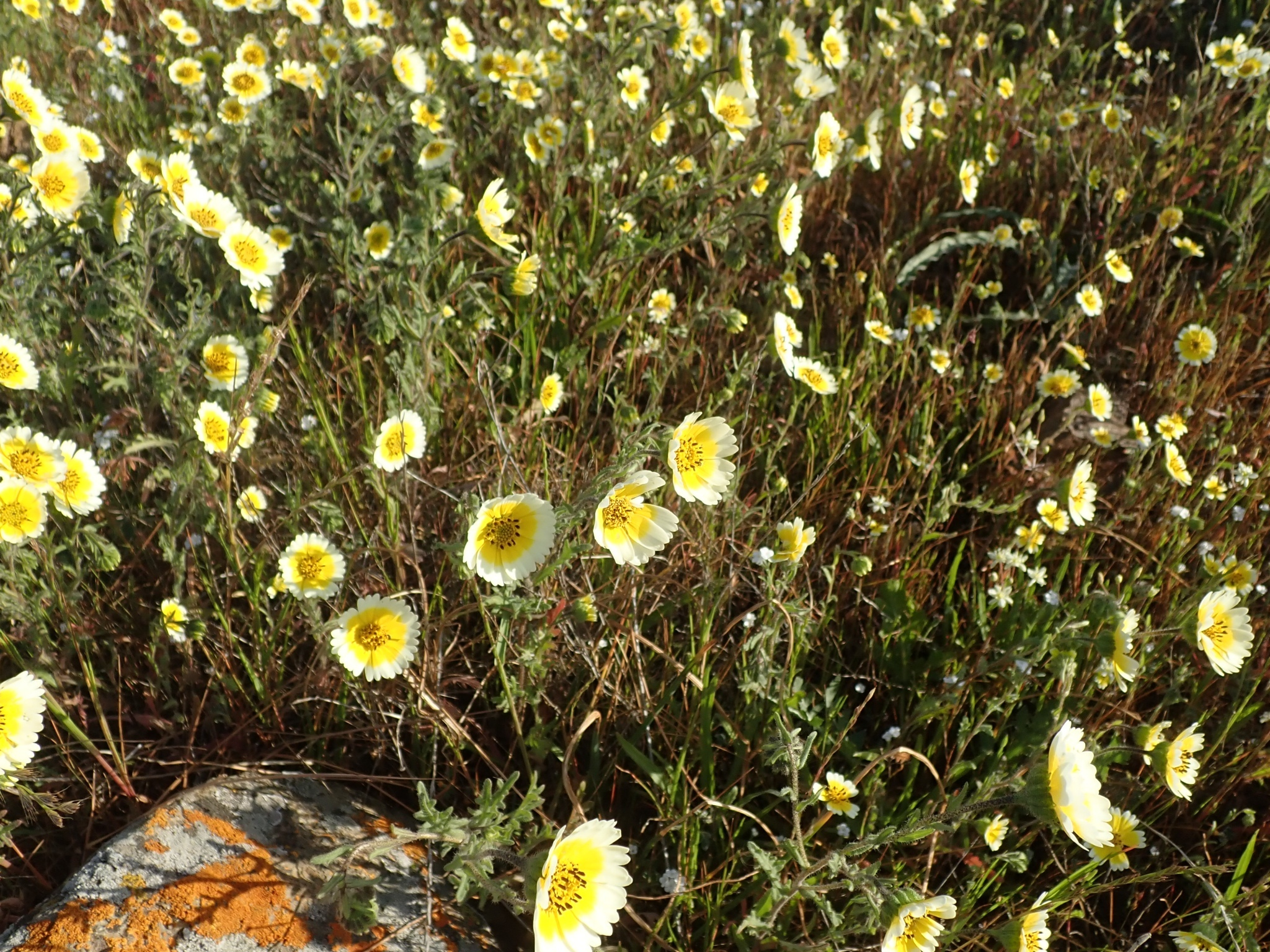

Scientific classification
- Kingdom: Plantae
- Clade: Tracheophytes
- Clade: Angiosperms
- Clade: Eudicots
- Clade: Asterids
- Order: Asterales
- Family: Asteraceae
- Genus: Layia
- Species: L. gaillardioides

Binomial name
- Layia gaillardioides (Hook. & Arn.) DC.

= Layia gaillardioides =

Species of flowering plant

Layia gaillardioides is a species of flowering plant in the family Asteraceae known by the common name woodland tidytips.

It is endemic to California, where it grows on the coastline and in the coastal mountain ranges in the northern and central parts of the state. It is often found on serpentine soils.

== Description ==
This is an aromatic annual herb producing an erect stem up to a meter tall coated in dark glandular hairs. The leaves are linear or lance-shaped, and the lower ones are lobed or toothed and approach 10 centimeters in maximum length.

The flower head has a nearly rounded base of fuzzy green phyllaries. It opens into a face fringed with bright yellow ray florets which are sometimes tipped with white, and a center of disc florets with purple anthers. The fruit is an achene; fruits on the disc florets often have a thick pappus of white or brown bristles.
