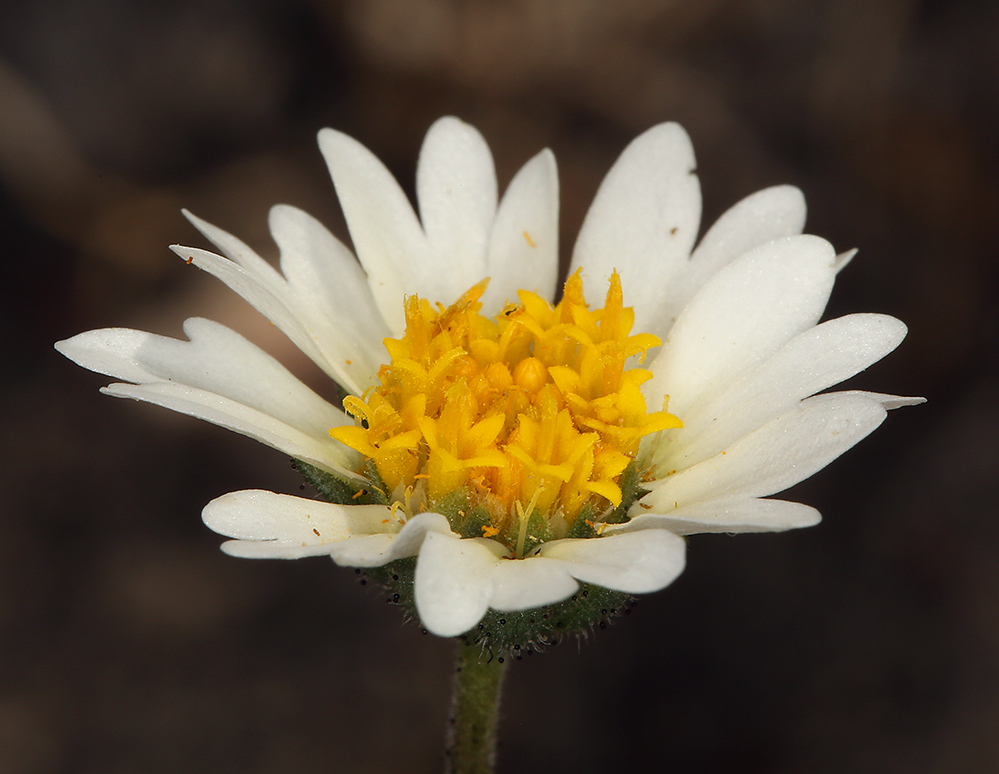

Conservation status
- Critically Imperiled (NatureServe)

Scientific classification
- Kingdom: Plantae
- Clade: Tracheophytes
- Clade: Angiosperms
- Clade: Eudicots
- Clade: Asterids
- Order: Asterales
- Family: Asteraceae
- Genus: Layia
- Species: L. leucopappa

Binomial name
- Layia leucopappa D.D.Keck

= Layia leucopappa =

Species of flowering plant

Layia leucopappa is a rare species of flowering plant in the family Asteraceae known by the common name Comanche Point tidytips, or Comanche Point layia.

== Distribution ==
The annual wildflower is endemic to California, where it is known only from the Tehachapi Mountains of southern Kern County in the vicinity of Tejon Ranch. Its distribution once extended onto the floor of the Central Valley, but it was eliminated from the area as the valley land was claimed for agriculture.

== Description ==
Layia leucopappa is an annual herb producing a light-colored, glandular stem to a maximum height just over 0.5 metres (1.6 ft). The leaves are fleshy and hairless except for ciliated edges. Smaller leaves are oval or oblong in shape and the larger ones are lobed and up to about 4 centimeters long.

The flower head contains white to cream-colored ray florets and yellow disc florets with yellow anthers.

The fruit is an achene; fruits from the disc florets are coated in white hairs and have a white pappus.
