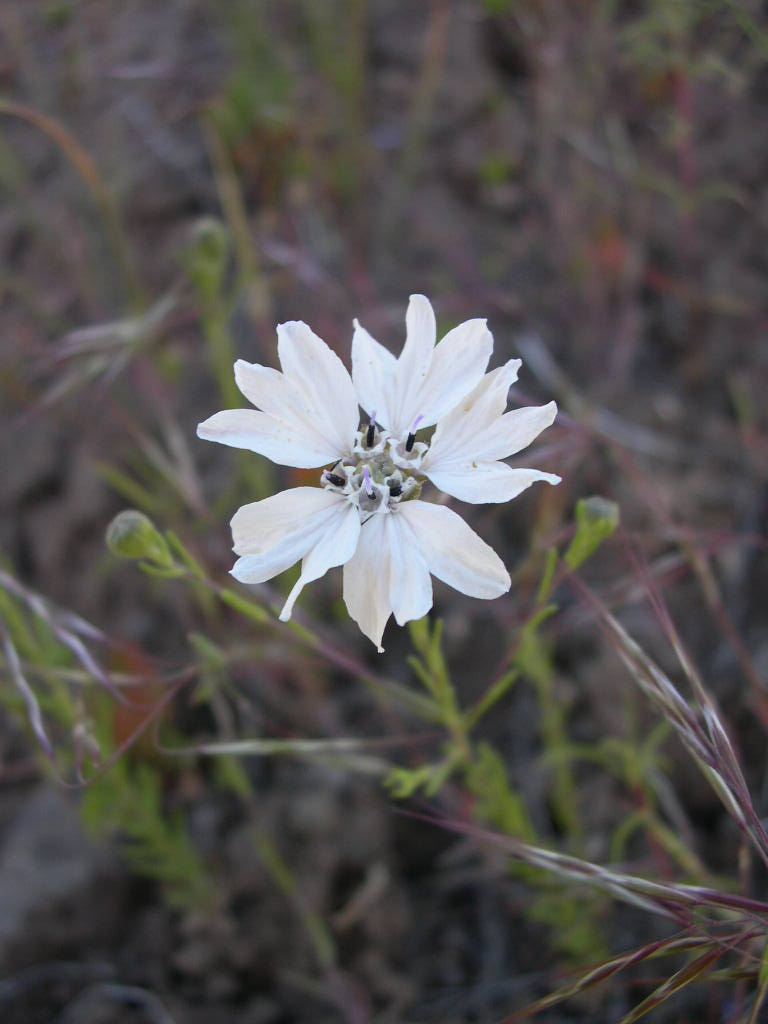

Scientific classification
- Kingdom: Plantae
- Clade: Tracheophytes
- Clade: Angiosperms
- Clade: Eudicots
- Clade: Asterids
- Order: Asterales
- Family: Asteraceae
- Subfamily: Asteroideae
- Tribe: Madieae
- Subtribe: Madiinae
- Genus: Blepharipappus; Hook.
- Species: B. scaber

Binomial name
- Blepharipappus scaber Hook.

= Blepharipappus =

Genus of flowering plants

Blepharipappus is a North American plant genus in the family Asteraceae containing the single known species Blepharipappus scaber, known by the common name rough eyelash, or rough eyelashweed. Blepharis is Greek for 'eyelash' and 'pappus' refers to the feathery part of the plant's seeds.

Blepharipappus scaber is a small, inconspicuous, annual plant herb to the northwestern United States (Washington, Idaho, Oregon, Nevada, and northern California). It grows in sandy soil in forests at elevations of 300–2,200 meters (980–7,220 ft) and in the western portion of the sagebrush steppe.

Growing up to several inches in height, the plant raises slender, fuzzy stems, with alternate leaves. Atop the stems bloom between one and several daisylike flower heads. These have 3–8 three-lobed ray florets, which are white with purple markings, while the center of the head is packed with about 10 white disc florets with purple anthers. The fruit is a dark achene which often bears a pappus of a few stiff, light colored bristles, resembling human eyelashes (hence the common name of the plant).

Some Plateau Indian tribes used as part of a treatment for bloody diarrhea.

The species is similar to Layia glandulosa, which has yellow disc flowers.
